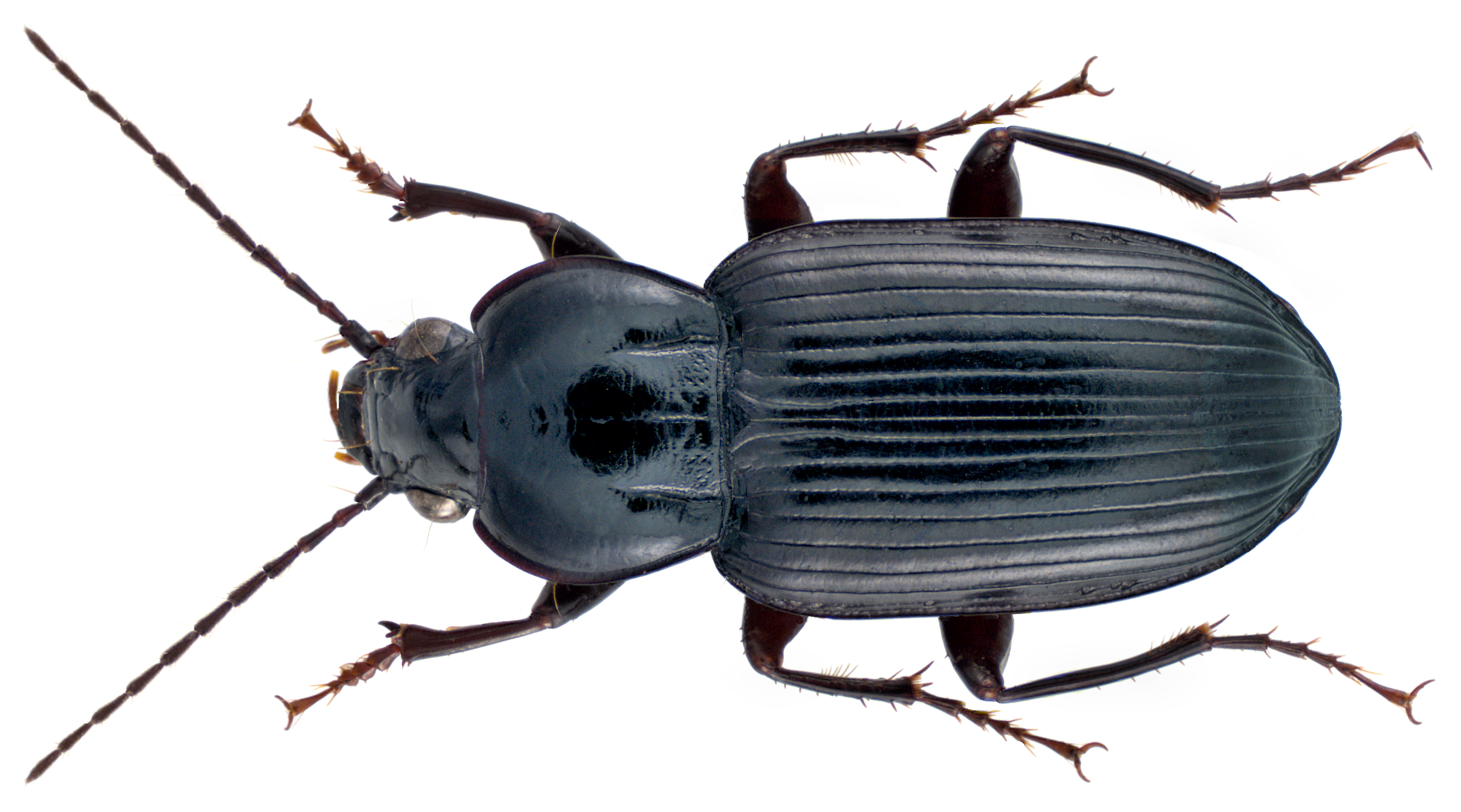

Scientific classification
- Domain: Eukaryota
- Kingdom: Animalia
- Phylum: Arthropoda
- Class: Insecta
- Order: Coleoptera
- Suborder: Adephaga
- Family: Carabidae
- Genus: Abacetus
- Species: A. parallelus

Binomial name
- Abacetus parallelus Roth, 1851

Synonyms
- Abacetus denticollis

= Abacetus parallelus =

Species of beetle

Abacetus parallelus is a species of ground beetle in the subfamily Pterostichinae. It was described by Roth in 1851.
