= Abacetus abacillus =

Scientific classification
- Domain: Eukaryota
- Kingdom: Animalia
- Phylum: Arthropoda
- Class: Insecta
- Order: Coleoptera
- Suborder: Adephaga
- Family: Carabidae
- Genus: Abacetus
- Species: A. abacillus

Binomial name
- Abacetus abacillus Kolbe, 1898

Species of beetle

Abacetus abacillus is a species of ground beetle in the subfamily Pterostichinae. It was described by Kolbe in 1898.

The species is found in Africa, distributed in Ethiopia and Zambia, and has two intraspecific taxa Abacetus abacillus abacillus Kolbe, 1898 and Abacetus abacillus dollmanni Straneo, 1949.
