= Abacetus leistoides =

Scientific classification
- Domain: Eukaryota
- Kingdom: Animalia
- Phylum: Arthropoda
- Class: Insecta
- Order: Coleoptera
- Suborder: Adephaga
- Family: Carabidae
- Genus: Abacetus
- Species: A. leistoides

Binomial name
- Abacetus leistoides Bates, 1886

Species of beetle

Abacetus leistoides is a species of ground beetle in the subfamily Pterostichinae. It was described by Henry Walter Bates in 1886.
