= Abacetus quadripustulatus =

Scientific classification
- Domain: Eukaryota
- Kingdom: Animalia
- Phylum: Arthropoda
- Class: Insecta
- Order: Coleoptera
- Suborder: Adephaga
- Family: Carabidae
- Genus: Abacetus
- Species: A. quadripustulatus

Binomial name
- Abacetus quadripustulatus Peyron, 1858

Species of beetle

Abacetus quadripustulatus is a species of ground beetle in the subfamily Pterostichinae. It was described by Peyron in 1858.
