= Abacetus simplex =

Scientific classification
- Domain: Eukaryota
- Kingdom: Animalia
- Phylum: Arthropoda
- Class: Insecta
- Order: Coleoptera
- Suborder: Adephaga
- Family: Carabidae
- Genus: Abacetus
- Species: A. simplex

Binomial name
- Abacetus simplex Blackburn, 1890

Species of beetle

Abacetus simplex is a species of ground beetle in the subfamily Pterostichinae. It was described by Blackburn in 1890.
