= Abacetus kandaharensis =

Scientific classification
- Domain: Eukaryota
- Kingdom: Animalia
- Phylum: Arthropoda
- Class: Insecta
- Order: Coleoptera
- Suborder: Adephaga
- Family: Carabidae
- Genus: Abacetus
- Species: A. kandaharensis

Binomial name
- Abacetus kandaharensis Jedlicka, 1956

Species of beetle

Abacetus kandaharensis is a species of ground beetle in the subfamily Pterostichinae. It was described by Jedlicka in 1956.
