= Abacetus semiopacus =

Scientific classification
- Domain: Eukaryota
- Kingdom: Animalia
- Phylum: Arthropoda
- Class: Insecta
- Order: Coleoptera
- Suborder: Adephaga
- Family: Carabidae
- Genus: Abacetus
- Species: A. semiopacus

Binomial name
- Abacetus semiopacus Straneo, 1948

Species of beetle

Abacetus semiopacus is a species of ground beetle in the subfamily Pterostichinae. It was described by Straneo in 1948. The beetle inhabits Africa, Australia and Asia and is one of 417 species in the Carabidae.
