= Abacetus gagates =

Scientific classification
- Kingdom: Animalia
- Phylum: Arthropoda
- Class: Insecta
- Order: Coleoptera
- Suborder: Adephaga
- Family: Carabidae
- Genus: Abacetus
- Species: A. gagates

Binomial name
- Abacetus gagates Dejean, 1828

Species of beetle

Abacetus gagates is a species of ground beetle in the subfamily Pterostichinae. It was described by Pierre François Marie Auguste Dejean in 1828.
