= Abacetus refleximargo =

Scientific classification
- Domain: Eukaryota
- Kingdom: Animalia
- Phylum: Arthropoda
- Class: Insecta
- Order: Coleoptera
- Suborder: Adephaga
- Family: Carabidae
- Genus: Abacetus
- Species: A. refleximargo

Binomial name
- Abacetus refleximargo Straneo, 1949

Species of beetle

Abacetus refleximargo is a species of ground beetle in the subfamily Pterostichinae. It was described by Straneo in 1949.
