= Abacetus mateui =

Scientific classification
- Kingdom: Animalia
- Phylum: Arthropoda
- Class: Insecta
- Order: Coleoptera
- Suborder: Adephaga
- Family: Carabidae
- Genus: Abacetus
- Species: A. mateui

Binomial name
- Abacetus mateui Straneo, 1959

Species of beetle

Abacetus mateui is a species of ground beetle in the subfamily Pterostichinae. It was described by Straneo in 1959 and is found in Equatorial Guinea, Africa.
