= Abacetus nigerrimus =

Scientific classification
- Kingdom: Animalia
- Phylum: Arthropoda
- Clade: Pancrustacea
- Class: Insecta
- Order: Coleoptera
- Suborder: Adephaga
- Family: Carabidae
- Genus: Abacetus
- Species: A. nigerrimus

Binomial name
- Abacetus nigerrimus Straneo, 1948

Species of beetle

Abacetus nigerrimus is a species of ground beetle in the subfamily Pterostichinae. It was described by Straneo in 1948.
