= Abacetus sulculatus =

Scientific classification
- Kingdom: Animalia
- Phylum: Arthropoda
- Class: Insecta
- Order: Coleoptera
- Suborder: Adephaga
- Family: Carabidae
- Genus: Abacetus
- Species: A. sulculatus

Binomial name
- Abacetus sulculatus Bates, 1892

Species of beetle

Abacetus sulculatus is a species of ground beetle in the subfamily Pterostichinae. It was described by Henry Walter Bates in 1892. It is found in Myanmar.
