= Abacetus semibrunneus =

Scientific classification
- Kingdom: Animalia
- Phylum: Arthropoda
- Class: Insecta
- Order: Coleoptera
- Suborder: Adephaga
- Family: Carabidae
- Genus: Abacetus
- Species: A. semibrunneus

Binomial name
- Abacetus semibrunneus Straneo, 1988

Species of beetle

Abacetus semibrunneus is a species of ground beetle in the subfamily Pterostichinae. It was described by Straneo in 1988.
