= Abacetus villiersianus =

Scientific classification
- Domain: Eukaryota
- Kingdom: Animalia
- Phylum: Arthropoda
- Class: Insecta
- Order: Coleoptera
- Suborder: Adephaga
- Family: Carabidae
- Genus: Abacetus
- Species: A. villiersianus

Binomial name
- Abacetus villiersianus Straneo, 1955

Species of beetle

Abacetus villiersianus is a species of ground beetle in the subfamily Pterostichinae. It was described by Straneo in 1955.
