= Abacetus atroirideus =

Scientific classification
- Kingdom: Animalia
- Phylum: Arthropoda
- Class: Insecta
- Order: Coleoptera
- Suborder: Adephaga
- Family: Carabidae
- Genus: Abacetus
- Species: A. atroirideus

Binomial name
- Abacetus atroirideus Straneo, 1959

Species of beetle

Abacetus atroirideus is a species of ground beetle in the subfamily Pterostichinae. It was described by Straneo in 1959 and is found in Democratic Republic of the Congo, Ethiopia and Rwanda.
