= Abacetus straneoi =

Scientific classification
- Domain: Eukaryota
- Kingdom: Animalia
- Phylum: Arthropoda
- Class: Insecta
- Order: Coleoptera
- Suborder: Adephaga
- Family: Carabidae
- Genus: Abacetus
- Species: A. straneoi

Binomial name
- Abacetus straneoi Basilewsky, 1946

Species of beetle

Abacetus straneoi is a species of ground beetle in the subfamily Pterostichinae. It was described by Basilewsky in 1946.
