= Abacetus rubidicollis =

Scientific classification
- Domain: Eukaryota
- Kingdom: Animalia
- Phylum: Arthropoda
- Class: Insecta
- Order: Coleoptera
- Suborder: Adephaga
- Family: Carabidae
- Genus: Abacetus
- Species: A. rubidicollis

Binomial name
- Abacetus rubidicollis (Wiedemann, 1823)

Species of beetle

Abacetus rubidicollis is a species of ground beetle in the subfamily Pterostichinae. It was described by Wiedemann in 1823.
