= Abacetus semotus =

Scientific classification
- Domain: Eukaryota
- Kingdom: Animalia
- Phylum: Arthropoda
- Class: Insecta
- Order: Coleoptera
- Suborder: Adephaga
- Family: Carabidae
- Genus: Abacetus
- Species: A. semotus

Binomial name
- Abacetus semotus Andrewes, 1942

Species of beetle

Abacetus semotus is a species of ground beetle in the subfamily Pterostichinae. It was described by Andrewes in 1942.
