= Abacetus asmarensis =

Scientific classification
- Domain: Eukaryota
- Kingdom: Animalia
- Phylum: Arthropoda
- Class: Insecta
- Order: Coleoptera
- Suborder: Adephaga
- Family: Carabidae
- Genus: Abacetus
- Species: A. asmarensis

Binomial name
- Abacetus asmarensis Jedlicka, 1956

Species of beetle

Abacetus asmarensis is a species of ground beetle in the subfamily Pterostichinae. It was described by Jedlicka in 1956 and is an endemic species found in Afghanistan.
