= Abacetus zanzibaricus =

Scientific classification
- Domain: Eukaryota
- Kingdom: Animalia
- Phylum: Arthropoda
- Class: Insecta
- Order: Coleoptera
- Suborder: Adephaga
- Family: Carabidae
- Genus: Abacetus
- Species: A. zanzibaricus

Binomial name
- Abacetus zanzibaricus Tschitscherine, 1898

Species of beetle

Abacetus zanzibaricus is a species of ground beetle in the subfamily Pterostichinae. It was described by Tschitscherine in 1898.
