= Abacetus pseudomashunus =

Scientific classification
- Kingdom: Animalia
- Phylum: Arthropoda
- Class: Insecta
- Order: Coleoptera
- Suborder: Adephaga
- Family: Carabidae
- Genus: Abacetus
- Species: A. pseudomashunus

Binomial name
- Abacetus pseudomashunus Straneo, 1950

Species of beetle

Abacetus pseudomashunus is a species of ground beetle in the subfamily Pterostichinae. It was described by Straneo in 1950.
