= Abacetus convexicollis =

Scientific classification
- Kingdom: Animalia
- Phylum: Arthropoda
- Class: Insecta
- Order: Coleoptera
- Suborder: Adephaga
- Family: Carabidae
- Genus: Abacetus
- Species: A. convexicollis

Binomial name
- Abacetus convexicollis Straneo, 1949

Species of beetle

Abacetus convexicollis is a species of ground beetle in the subfamily Pterostichinae. It was described by Straneo in 1949.
