= Abacetus rugatinus =

Scientific classification
- Domain: Eukaryota
- Kingdom: Animalia
- Phylum: Arthropoda
- Class: Insecta
- Order: Coleoptera
- Suborder: Adephaga
- Family: Carabidae
- Genus: Abacetus
- Species: A. rugatinus

Binomial name
- Abacetus rugatinus (Csiki, 1930)

Species of insect

Abacetus rugatinus is a species of ground beetle in the subfamily Pterostichinae. It was described by Csiki in 1930.
