= Abacetus mubalensis =

Scientific classification
- Kingdom: Animalia
- Phylum: Arthropoda
- Class: Insecta
- Order: Coleoptera
- Suborder: Adephaga
- Family: Carabidae
- Genus: Abacetus
- Species: A. mubalensis

Binomial name
- Abacetus mubalensis Straneo, 1958

Species of beetle

Abacetus mubalensis is a species of ground beetle in the subfamily Pterostichinae. It was described by Straneo in 1958.
