= Abacetus gimmanus =

Scientific classification
- Domain: Eukaryota
- Kingdom: Animalia
- Phylum: Arthropoda
- Class: Insecta
- Order: Coleoptera
- Suborder: Adephaga
- Family: Carabidae
- Genus: Abacetus
- Species: A. gimmanus

Binomial name
- Abacetus gimmanus Straneo, 1979

Species of beetle

Abacetus gimmanus is a species of ground beetle in the subfamily Pterostichinae. It was described by Straneo in 1979.
