= Abacetus amaroides =

Scientific classification
- Kingdom: Animalia
- Phylum: Arthropoda
- Class: Insecta
- Order: Coleoptera
- Suborder: Adephaga
- Family: Carabidae
- Genus: Abacetus
- Species: A. amaroides

Binomial name
- Abacetus amaroides Laferte-Senectere, 1853

Species of beetle

Abacetus amaroides is a species of ground beetle in the subfamily Pterostichinae. It was described by Laferte-Senectere in 1853 and is found across West Africa and the Democratic Republic of the Congo.
