= Abacetus picicollis =

Scientific classification
- Domain: Eukaryota
- Kingdom: Animalia
- Phylum: Arthropoda
- Class: Insecta
- Order: Coleoptera
- Suborder: Adephaga
- Family: Carabidae
- Genus: Abacetus
- Species: A. picicollis

Binomial name
- Abacetus picicollis Laferte-Senectere, 1853

Species of beetle

Abacetus picicollis is a species of ground beetle in the subfamily Pterostichinae. It was described by Laferte-Senectere in 1853.
