= Abacetus claripes =

Scientific classification
- Kingdom: Animalia
- Phylum: Arthropoda
- Class: Insecta
- Order: Coleoptera
- Suborder: Adephaga
- Family: Carabidae
- Genus: Abacetus
- Species: A. claripes

Binomial name
- Abacetus claripes Straneo, 1949

Species of beetle

Abacetus claripes is a species of ground beetle in the subfamily Pterostichinae. It was described by Straneo in 1949.
