= Abacetus illuminans =

Scientific classification
- Domain: Eukaryota
- Kingdom: Animalia
- Phylum: Arthropoda
- Class: Insecta
- Order: Coleoptera
- Suborder: Adephaga
- Family: Carabidae
- Genus: Abacetus
- Species: A. illuminans

Binomial name
- Abacetus illuminans Bates, 1892

Species of beetle

Abacetus illuminans is a species of ground beetle in the subfamily Pterostichinae. It was described by Henry Walter Bates in 1892.
