= Abacetus metallescens =

Scientific classification
- Domain: Eukaryota
- Kingdom: Animalia
- Phylum: Arthropoda
- Class: Insecta
- Order: Coleoptera
- Suborder: Adephaga
- Family: Carabidae
- Genus: Abacetus
- Species: A. metallescens

Binomial name
- Abacetus metallescens Tschitscherine, 1899

Species of beetle

Abacetus metallescens is a species of ground beetle in the subfamily Pterostichinae. It was described by Tschitscherine in 1899. It is classified under the subgenus Distrigodes, and confirmed as a valid species by both GBIF and the Catalogue of Life. Known distribution is limited to the Democratic Republic of the Congo.
