= Abacetus amplithorax =

Scientific classification
- Kingdom: Animalia
- Phylum: Arthropoda
- Class: Insecta
- Order: Coleoptera
- Suborder: Adephaga
- Family: Carabidae
- Genus: Abacetus
- Species: A. amplithorax

Binomial name
- Abacetus amplithorax Straneo, 1940

Species of beetle

Abacetus amplithorax is a species of ground beetle in the subfamily Pterostichinae. It was described by Straneo in 1940 and is an endemic species of Sao Tome and Principe.
