= Abacetus hexagonus =

Scientific classification
- Domain: Eukaryota
- Kingdom: Animalia
- Phylum: Arthropoda
- Class: Insecta
- Order: Coleoptera
- Suborder: Adephaga
- Family: Carabidae
- Genus: Abacetus
- Species: A. hexagonus

Binomial name
- Abacetus hexagonus Straneo, 1992

Species of beetle

Abacetus hexagonus is a species of ground beetle in the subfamily Pterostichinae. It was described by Straneo in 1992.
