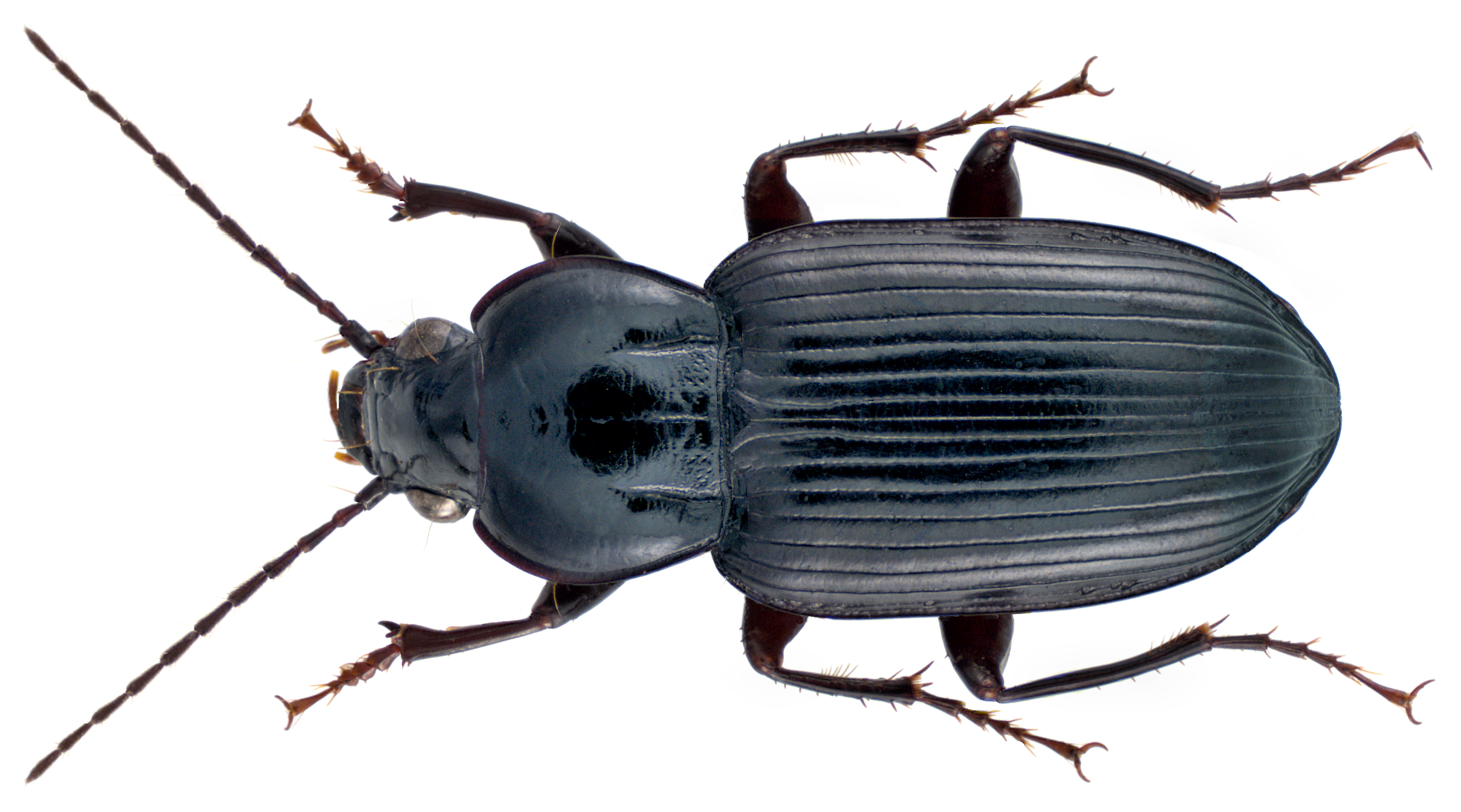
- Abacetus parallelus

Scientific classification
- Kingdom: Animalia
- Phylum: Arthropoda
- Class: Insecta
- Order: Coleoptera
- Suborder: Adephaga
- Family: Carabidae
- Tribe: Abacetini
- Genus: Abacetus; Dejean, 1828

Synonyms
- Abacetillus Straneo, 1943; Aeneoabacetus Straneo, 1943; Alogus Motschoulsky, 1865; Astrigus Rambur, 1838; Astygis Lacordaire, 1854; Bisulcillus Straneo, 1945; Caricus Motschoulsky, 1866; Creciabacetus Straneo, 1943; Creniabacetus Straneo, 1943; Distrigodes Motschoulsky, 1864; Distrigus Dejean, 1828; Novastygis Straneo, 1949; Parastygis Straneo, 1943; Setabacetus Straneo, 1943; Triaenabacetus Straneo, 1943

= Abacetus =

Genus of beetles

Abacetus is a genus of beetles in the family Carabidae, distributed across Africa, Asia and Australia, with a single European species. It contains the following species:

- Abacetus abacillus Kolbe, 1898
- Abacetus aberrans Straneo, 1943
- Abacetus abor Andrewes, 1942
- Abacetus acutangulus Tschitscherine, 1903
- Abacetus aeneolus Chaudoir, 1869
- Abacetus aeneocordatus Straneo, 1940
- Abacetus aeneovirescens Straneo, 1939
- Abacetus aenescens Peringuey, 1896
- Abacetus aeneus Dejean, 1828
- Abacetus aenigma Chaudoir, 1869
- Abacetus aeratus Tschitscherine, 1900
- Abacetus afer Tschitscherine, 1899
- Abacetus alacer Peringuey, 1896
- Abacetus alaticollis Straneo, 1957
- Abacetus alesi Jedlicka, 1936
- Abacetus alluaudi Tschitscherine, 1899
- Abacetus amaroides Laferte-Senectere, 1853
- Abacetus ambiguus Straneo, 1969
- Abacetus amplicollis Bates, 1890
- Abacetus amplithorax Straneo, 1940
- Abacetus angolanus Straneo, 1940
- Abacetus angustatus Klug, 1853
- Abacetus angustior W.j.macleay, 1871
- Abacetus anjouaniananus (Straneo), 1973
- Abacetus annamensis (Tschitscherine, 1903)
- Abacetus anthracinus Tschitscherine, 1900
- Abacetus antiquus (Dejean, 1828)
- Abacetus antoinei Straneo, 1951
- Abacetus archambaulti Straneo, 1955
- Abacetus artus Andrewes, 1942
- Abacetus asmarensis Jedlicka, 1956
- Abacetus assiniensis Tschitscherine, 1899
- Abacetus ater W.J.Macleay, 1871
- Abacetus aterrimus Peringuey, 1896
- Abacetus atratus (Dejean, 1828)
- Abacetus atroirideus (Straneo), 1959
- Abacetus audax Laferte-Senectere, 1853
- Abacetus auratus (Straneo), 1949
- Abacetus australasiae Chaudoir, 1878
- Abacetus azurescens (Straneo), 1955
- Abacetus barbieri (Straneo), 1961
- Abacetus basilewskyi (Straneo, 1948)
- Abacetus batesi Andrewes, 1926
- Abacetus bechynei (Straneo, 1948)
- Abacetus belli Andrewes, 1942
- Abacetus bembidioides (Straneo), 1949
- Abacetus bequaerti Burgeon, 1934
- Abacetus bicolor (Straneo), 1971
- Abacetus bidentatus Andrewes, 1942
- Abacetus bifoveatus Straneo, 1963
- Abacetus bipunctatus (Motschulsky, 1864)
- Abacetus birmanus (Bates, 1890)
- Abacetus bisignatus Bates, 1890
- Abacetus blandus Andrewes, 1942
- Abacetus borealis Andrewes, 1942
- Abacetus bredoi Burgeon, 1934
- Abacetus brevicollis (Straneo), 1954
- Abacetus brevisternus (Straneo), 1951
- Abacetus brunneus (Straneo), 1939
- Abacetus cameronus Bates, 1886
- Abacetus candidus Andrewes, 1942
- Abacetus carnifer Andrewes, 1942
- Abacetus catalai (Jeannel, 1948)
- Abacetus catersi (Straneo), 1958
- Abacetus cavicola Straneo, 1955
- Abacetus ceratus Straneo, 1940
- Abacetus ceylandoides Straneo, 1953
- Abacetus ceylanicus (Nietner, 1858)
- Abacetus chalceus Chaudoir, 1869
- Abacetus chalcites Peringuey, 1896
- Abacetus chalcopterus Tschitscherine, 1900
- Abacetus claripes Straneo, 1949
- Abacetus collarti Straneo, 1948
- Abacetus communis Straneo, 1963
- Abacetus compactus Andrewes, 1942
- Abacetus complanatus Straneo, 1963
- Abacetus confinis (Boheman, 1848)
- Abacetus congoanus Burgeon, 1935
- Abacetus congoensis Tschitscherine, 1899
- Abacetus conradsi Straneo, 1939
- Abacetus contractus Chaudoir, 1876
- Abacetus convexicollis Straneo, 1949
- Abacetus convexiusculus Chaudoir, 1869
- Abacetus cordatissimus Straneo, 1941
- Abacetus cordatus Dejean, 1831
- Abacetus cordicollis Chaudoir, 1869
- Abacetus corvinus Klug, 1833
- Abacetus coscinioderus Chaudoir, 1876
- Abacetus crebrepunctatus Straneo, 1975
- Abacetus crenipennis Chaudoir, 1869
- Abacetus crenulatus Dejean, 1831
- Abacetus crenulicordatus Straneo, 1940
- Abacetus cribratellus Straneo, 1964
- Abacetus cribricollis (Dejean, 1831)
- Abacetus crinifer Tschitscherine, 1899
- Abacetus cuneatus (Fairmaire, 1887)
- Abacetus cuneipennis Straneo, 1961
- Abacetus cursor Peringuey, 1899
- Abacetus curtus Chaudoir, 1869
- Abacetus cyathoderus Chaudoir, 1869
- Abacetus cycloderus Andrewes, 1942
- Abacetus cyclomus Tschitscherine, 1903
- Abacetus dahomeyanus Straneo, 1940
- Abacetus dainellii Straneo, 1940
- Abacetus darlingtoni Straneo, 1984
- Abacetus decorsei Tschitscherine, 1901
- Abacetus dejeani (Nietner, 1858)
- Abacetus dekkanus Andrewes, 1942
- Abacetus delkeskampi Straneo, 1957
- Abacetus demoulini Straneo, 1963
- Abacetus denticollis Chaudoir, 1878
- Abacetus desaegeri Straneo, 1963
- Abacetus dilutipes Chaudoir, 1869
- Abacetus discolor (Roth, 1851)
- Abacetus disjunctus Andrewes, 1942
- Abacetus distigma Tschitscherine, 1899
- Abacetus distinctus Chaudoir, 1878
- Abacetus divergens Tschitscherine, 1899
- Abacetus diversus Peringuey, 1899
- Abacetus dorsalis (Motschulsky, 1866)
- Abacetus drimostomoides Chaudoir, 1869
- Abacetus duvivieri Tschitscherine, 1899
- Abacetus ellipticus Tschitscherine, 1898
- Abacetus elongatus Laferte-Senectere, 1853
- Abacetus elongellus Straneo, 1946
- Abacetus emeritus Peringuey, 1899
- Abacetus ennedianus Mateu, 1966
- Abacetus eous Andrewes, 1942
- Abacetus evulsus Peringuey, 1904
- Abacetus excavatus Straneo, 1949
- Abacetus exul Tschitscherine, 1900
- Abacetus feai Straneo, 1940
- Abacetus femoralis (Motschulsky, 1864)
- Abacetus fimbriatus Straneo, 1940
- Abacetus flavipes C.G.Thomson, 1858
- Abacetus foveifrons Bates, 1892
- Abacetus foveolatus Chaudoir, 1876
- Abacetus franzi Straneo, 1961
- Abacetus fraternus Tschitscherine, 1899
- Abacetus freyi Straneo, 1956
- Abacetus fulvomarginatus Straneo, 1956
- Abacetus furax Andrewes, 1936
- Abacetus fuscipes (Klug, 1833)
- Abacetus fuscorufescens Straneo, 1939
- Abacetus fuscus Straneo, 1941
- Abacetus gagates Dejean, 1828
- Abacetus gagatinus Chaudoir, 1869
- Abacetus ganglbaueri Tschitscherine, 1898
- Abacetus garavagliai Straneo, 1939
- Abacetus germanus Chaudoir, 1876
- Abacetus gimmanus Straneo, 1979
- Abacetus globulicollis Straneo, 1971
- Abacetus gondati Chaudoir, 1869
- Abacetus grandis Laferte-Senectere, 1853
- Abacetus guineensis Straneo, 1940
- Abacetus guttiger Andrewes, 1942
- Abacetus guttula Chaudoir, 1869
- Abacetus haemorrhous Chaudoir, 1878
- Abacetus haplosternus Chaudoir, 1878
- Abacetus hararinus Straneo, 1939
- Abacetus harpaloides Laferte-Senectere, 1853
- Abacetus hessei Straneo, 1940
- Abacetus hexagonus Straneo, 1992
- Abacetus hiekei Straneo, 1975
- Abacetus hirmocoeloides Straneo, 1949
- Abacetus hirmocoelus Chaudoir, 1869
- Abacetus hova Tschitscherine, 1899
- Abacetus hulstaerti Burgeon, 1935
- Abacetus humeratus Straneo, 1957
- Abacetus humilis Tschitscherine, 1903
- Abacetus idiomerus Tschitscherine, 1900
- Abacetus ifani Straneo, 1971
- Abacetus illuminans Bates, 1892
- Abacetus imerinae Tschitscherine, 1899
- Abacetus immarginatus Straneo, 1956
- Abacetus impressicollis (Dejean, 1828)
- Abacetus impunctus Andrewes, 1942
- Abacetus incertus Straneo, 1963
- Abacetus indrapoerae Tschitscherine, 1903
- Abacetus inexpectatus Kryzhanovskij & Abdurachmanov, 1983
- Abacetus infimus Tschitscherine, 1900
- Abacetus inopinus Peringuey, 1904
- Abacetus insolatus Bates, 1892
- Abacetus insularis Tschitscherine, 1900
- Abacetus intermedius Tschitscherine, 1899
- Abacetus iricolor Andrewes, 1936
- Abacetus iridescens Laferte-Senectere, 1853
- Abacetus iridipennis Fairmaire, 1868
- Abacetus ituriensis Straneo, 1956
- Abacetus jedlickai Straneo, 1963
- Abacetus johannae Straneo, 1961
- Abacetus kandaharensis Jedlicka, 1956
- Abacetus katanganus Burgeon, 1934
- Abacetus kivuanus Straneo, 1944
- Abacetus klickai Jedlicka, 1935
- Abacetus kochi Straneo, 1963
- Abacetus kordofanicus Tschitscherine, 1898
- Abacetus laevigatus Straneo, 1960
- Abacetus latemarginatus Straneo, 1940
- Abacetus latus Tschitscherine, 1898
- Abacetus lautus Peringuey, 1904
- Abacetus lecordieri Straneo, 1969
- Abacetus leistoides Bates, 1886
- Abacetus leleupi Straneo, 1951
- Abacetus leonensis Tschitscherine, 1899
- Abacetus leucotelus Bates, 1873
- Abacetus levisulcatus Straneo, 1939
- Abacetus liberianus Tschitscherine, 1899
- Abacetus longelytratus Straneo, 1951
- Abacetus longissimus Straneo, 1940
- Abacetus longiusculus Chaudoir, 1869
- Abacetus longulus Tschitscherine, 1900
- Abacetus loricatus Laferte-Senectere, 1853
- Abacetus lucidulus Peringuey, 1896
- Abacetus lucifugus Andrewes, 1924
- Abacetus luteipes Andrewes, 1942
- Abacetus mabalianus Straneo, 1956
- Abacetus macer Straneo, 1963
- Abacetus maculatus Straneo, 1949
- Abacetus madagascariensis (Dejean, 1831)
- Abacetus major Straneo, 1939
- Abacetus majorinus Peringuey, 1896
- Abacetus mameti Alluaud, 1933
- Abacetus mareei Straneo, 1951
- Abacetus marginatus Straneo, 1971
- Abacetus marginibasis Straneo, 1963
- Abacetus marginicollis Chaudoir, 1869
- Abacetus marshalli Straneo, 1940
- Abacetus mashunus Peringuey, 1896
- Abacetus mateui Straneo, 1959
- Abacetus mediopunctatus Straneo, 1951
- Abacetus melancholicus Laferte-Senectere, 1853
- Abacetus metallescens Tschitscherine, 1899
- Abacetus micans Straneo, 1951
- Abacetus michaelseni Kuntzen, 1919
- Abacetus micros Tschitscherine, 1899
- Abacetus minimus Straneo, 1940
- Abacetus minusculus Straneo, 1938
- Abacetus minutus (Dejean, 1831)
- Abacetus mirei Straneo, 1964
- Abacetus monardi Straneo, 1951
- Abacetus monardianus Straneo, 1952
- Abacetus mouffleti Chaudoir, 1876
- Abacetus mubalensis Straneo, 1958
- Abacetus multipunctatus Straneo, 1956
- Abacetus myops Straneo, 1959
- Abacetus nanus Chaudoir, 1869
- Abacetus natalensis Chaudoir, 1869
- Abacetus neghellianus Straneo, 1939
- Abacetus niger Andrewes, 1942
- Abacetus nigerrimus Straneo, 1948
- Abacetus nigrans Tschitscherine, 1901
- Abacetus nigrinus (Boheman, 1848)
- Abacetus nitens Tschitscherine, 1899
- Abacetus nitidulus Tschitscherine, 1900
- Abacetus nitidus Tschitscherine, 1900
- Abacetus notabilis Straneo, 1960
- Abacetus obesulus Straneo, 1940
- Abacetus oblongus Chaudoir, 1869
- Abacetus obscurus Andrewes, 1933
- Abacetus obtusus (Boheman, 1848)
- Abacetus occidentalis Tschitscherine, 1899
- Abacetus olivaceus Tschitscherine, 1900
- Abacetus optatus Andrewes, 1942
- Abacetus optimus Peringuey, 1904
- Abacetus orbicollis Straneo, 1988
- Abacetus oritoides Straneo, 1949
- Abacetus ornatus Tschitscherine, 1900
- Abacetus ovalis Straneo, 1940
- Abacetus overlaeti Burgeon, 1934
- Abacetus pallipes Chaudoir, 1869
- Abacetus parallelus Roth, 1851
- Abacetus parvulus (Klug, 1853)
- Abacetus patrizii Straneo, 1938
- Abacetus pavoninus Peringuey, 1899
- Abacetus perater Straneo, 1951
- Abacetus percoides Fairmaire, 1868
- Abacetus perplexus Peringuey, 1896
- Abacetus perrieri Tschitscherine, 1903
- Abacetus perturbator Peringuey, 1899
- Abacetus picescens Tschitscherine, 1900
- Abacetus picicollis Laferte-Senectere, 1853
- Abacetus picipes (Motschulsky, 1866)
- Abacetus picticornis Chaudoir, 1878
- Abacetus pictus Tschitscherine, 1900
- Abacetus piliger Chaudoir, 1876
- Abacetus pintori Straneo, 1940
- Abacetus planidorsis Straneo, 1949
- Abacetus planulus Straneo, 1940
- Abacetus poeciloides Straneo, 1949
- Abacetus politulus Chaudoir, 1869
- Abacetus politus Chaudoir, 1869
- Abacetus polli Straneo, 1949
- Abacetus pomeroyi Straneo, 1955
- Abacetus procax Tschitscherine, 1899
- Abacetus profundillus Straneo, 1943
- Abacetus promptus (Dejean, 1828)
- Abacetus protensus Chaudoir, 1876
- Abacetus proximus Peringuey, 1899
- Abacetus pseudangolanus Straneo, 1952
- Abacetus pseudoceratus Straneo, 1975
- Abacetus pseudoflavipes Straneo, 1939
- Abacetus pseudomashunus Straneo, 1950
- Abacetus pubescens Dejean, 1831
- Abacetus pullus Tschitscherine, 1899
- Abacetus pumilus (Boheman, 1848)
- Abacetus punctatellus Straneo, 1975
- Abacetus punctatostriatus Straneo, 1940
- Abacetus punctatosulcatus Chaudoir, 1869
- Abacetus punctibasis Straneo, 1940
- Abacetus puncticeps Straneo, 1963
- Abacetus puncticollis Straneo, 1951
- Abacetus punctulatus Straneo, 1960
- Abacetus pygmaeus Boheman, 1848
- Abacetus quadraticollis J.Thomson, 1858
- Abacetus quadratipennis W.J.Macleay, 1888
- Abacetus quadricollis Chaudoir, 1869
- Abacetus quadriguttatus Chaudoir, 1869
- Abacetus quadrinotatus Chaudoir, 1869
- Abacetus quadripustulatus Peyron, 1858
- Abacetus quadrisignatus Chaudoir, 1876
- Abacetus radama (Jeannel, 1948)
- Abacetus refleximargo Straneo, 1949
- Abacetus reflexus Chaudoir, 1869
- Abacetus rhodesianus Straneo, 1951
- Abacetus rotundicollis Straneo, 1951
- Abacetus rubidicollis (Wiedemann, 1823)
- Abacetus rubidus Burgeon, 1935
- Abacetus rubromarginatus Straneo, 1940
- Abacetus rufinus Straneo, 1943
- Abacetus rufipalpis Chaudoir, 1869
- Abacetus rufipes Laferte-Senectere, 1853
- Abacetus rufoapicatus Straneo, 1940
- Abacetus rufopiceus (Nietner, 1858)
- Abacetus rufotestaceus Chaudoir, 1869
- Abacetus rufulus (Motschulsky, 1866)
- Abacetus rugatinus (Csiki, 1930)
- Abacetus salamensis (Kolbe), 1898
- Abacetus salzmanni Germar, 1824
- Abacetus seineri Kuntzen, 1919
- Abacetus semibrunneus Straneo, 1988
- Abacetus semiopacus Straneo, 1948
- Abacetus semotus Andrewes, 1942
- Abacetus senegalensis (Dejean, 1831)
- Abacetus servitulus Peringuey, 1904
- Abacetus setifer Tschitscherine, 1903
- Abacetus severini Tschitscherine, 1899
- Abacetus shilouvanus Peringuey, 1904
- Abacetus siamensis Chaudoir, 1878
- Abacetus silvanus Andrewes, 1942
- Abacetus simillimus Straneo, 1960
- Abacetus simplex Blackburn, 1890
- Abacetus sinuatellus Straneo, 1949
- Abacetus sinuaticollis Straneo, 1939
- Abacetus somalus Straneo, 1939
- Abacetus spinicollis Straneo, 1963
- Abacetus spissus Andrewes, 1937
- Abacetus spurius Tschitscherine, 1899
- Abacetus stenoderus (Motschulsky, 1866)
- Abacetus straneoi Basilewsky, 1946
- Abacetus strenuus Tschitscherine, 1899
- Abacetus striatus Chaudoir, 1869
- Abacetus subamaroides Straneo, 1964
- Abacetus subauratus Straneo, 1949
- Abacetus subdepressus Straneo, 1960
- Abacetus subflavipes Straneo, 1951
- Abacetus subglobosus Chaudoir, 1869
- Abacetus sublucidulus Straneo, 1949
- Abacetus submetallicus Nietner, 1858
- Abacetus subnitens Straneo, 1951
- Abacetus suboccidentalis Straneo, 1953
- Abacetus suborbicollis Straneo, 1965
- Abacetus subparallelus Straneo, 1940
- Abacetus subpunctatus Chaudoir, 1869
- Abacetus subrotundatus Straneo, 1951
- Abacetus subrotundus Straneo, 1959
- Abacetus subtilis Straneo, 1949
- Abacetus sudanicus Straneo, 1984
- Abacetus sulculatus Bates, 1892
- Abacetus tanakai Straneo, 1961
- Abacetus tanganjikae Tschitscherine, 1899
- Abacetus tenebrioides Castelnau, 1834
- Abacetus tenuimanus Tschitscherine, 1901
- Abacetus tenuis Laferte-Senectere, 1853
- Abacetus testaceipes (Motschulsky, 1864)
- Abacetus tetraspilus Andrewes, 1929
- Abacetus thoracicus (Jeannel, 1948)
- Abacetus thouzeti (Castelnau, 1867)
- Abacetus tibialis Chaudoir, 1878
- Abacetus tibiellus Chaudoir, 1869
- Abacetus transcaucasicus Chaudoir, 1876
- Abacetus trapezialis Straneo, 1949
- Abacetus trechoides Peringuey, 1896
- Abacetus treichi Alluaud, 1935
- Abacetus tridens Tschitscherine, 1899
- Abacetus trivialis Tschitscherine, 1899
- Abacetus trivialoides Straneo, 1951
- Abacetus ueleanus Burgeon, 1935
- Abacetus ukerewianus Straneo, 1940
- Abacetus unisetosus Straneo, 1939
- Abacetus usagarensis (Ancey, 1882)
- Abacetus usherae Straneo, 1962
- Abacetus vaccaroi Straneo, 1940
- Abacetus vadoni (Jeannel, 1948)
- Abacetus vanemdeni Straneo, 1939
- Abacetus vatovai Straneo, 1941
- Abacetus verschureni Straneo, 1963
- Abacetus vertagus Peringuey, 1904
- Abacetus vexator Peringuey, 1904
- Abacetus villiersi Straneo, 1951
- Abacetus villiersianus Straneo, 1955
- Abacetus virescens Straneo, 1940
- Abacetus vitreus Andrewes, 1942
- Abacetus voltae Tschitscherine, 1901
- Abacetus wakefieldi Bates, 1886
- Abacetus wittei Straneo, 1954
- Abacetus xanthopoides Straneo, 1951
- Abacetus xanthopus Tschitscherine, 1899
- Abacetus zanzibaricus Tschitscherine, 1898
- Abacetus zarudnyi Tschitscherine, 1901
