= Abacetus brevisternus =

Scientific classification
- Kingdom: Animalia
- Phylum: Arthropoda
- Class: Insecta
- Order: Coleoptera
- Suborder: Adephaga
- Family: Carabidae
- Genus: Abacetus
- Species: A. brevisternus

Binomial name
- Abacetus brevisternus Straneo, 1951

Species of beetle

Abacetus brevisternus is a species of ground beetle in the subfamily Pterostichinae. It was described by Straneo in 1951.
