= Abacetus pintori =

Scientific classification
- Kingdom: Animalia
- Phylum: Arthropoda
- Class: Insecta
- Order: Coleoptera
- Suborder: Adephaga
- Family: Carabidae
- Genus: Abacetus
- Species: A. pintori

Binomial name
- Abacetus pintori Straneo, 1940

Species of beetle

Abacetus pintori is a species of ground beetle in the subfamily Pterostichinae. It was described by Straneo in 1940 and is found in Ethiopia and Tanzania.
