= Abacetus lecordieri =

Scientific classification
- Kingdom: Animalia
- Phylum: Arthropoda
- Class: Insecta
- Order: Coleoptera
- Suborder: Adephaga
- Family: Carabidae
- Genus: Abacetus
- Species: A. lecordieri

Binomial name
- Abacetus lecordieri Straneo, 1969

Species of beetle

Abacetus lecordieri is a species of ground beetle in the subfamily Pterostichinae. It was described by Straneo in 1969. The species is endemic to Côte d'Ivoire.
