= Abacetus mameti =

Scientific classification
- Domain: Eukaryota
- Kingdom: Animalia
- Phylum: Arthropoda
- Class: Insecta
- Order: Coleoptera
- Suborder: Adephaga
- Family: Carabidae
- Genus: Abacetus
- Species: A. mameti

Binomial name
- Abacetus mameti Alluaud, 1933

Species of beetle

Abacetus mameti is a species of ground beetle in the subfamily Pterostichinae. It was described by Alluaud in 1933.
