= Abacetus klickai =

Scientific classification
- Kingdom: Animalia
- Phylum: Arthropoda
- Clade: Pancrustacea
- Class: Insecta
- Order: Coleoptera
- Suborder: Adephaga
- Family: Carabidae
- Genus: Abacetus
- Species: A. klickai

Binomial name
- Abacetus klickai Jedlicka, 1935

Species of beetle

Abacetus klickai is a species of ground beetle in the subfamily Pterostichinae. It occurs in the Philippines.
