= Abacetus assiniensis =

Scientific classification
- Kingdom: Animalia
- Phylum: Arthropoda
- Class: Insecta
- Order: Coleoptera
- Suborder: Adephaga
- Family: Carabidae
- Genus: Abacetus
- Species: A. assiniensis

Binomial name
- Abacetus assiniensis Tschitscherine, 1899

Subspecies
- Abacetus assiniensis assiniensis Tschitscherine, 1899; Abacetus assiniensis sudanensis Straneo, 1940

Species of beetle

Abacetus assiniensis is a species of ground beetle in the subfamily Pterostichinae. It was described by Tschitscherine in 1899 and is found in Ivory Coast and Sudan.
