= Abacetus patrizii =

Scientific classification
- Kingdom: Animalia
- Phylum: Arthropoda
- Class: Insecta
- Order: Coleoptera
- Suborder: Adephaga
- Family: Carabidae
- Genus: Abacetus
- Species: A. patrizii

Binomial name
- Abacetus patrizii Straneo, 1938

Species of beetle

Abacetus patrizii is a species of ground beetle in the subfamily Pterostichinae. It was described by Straneo in 1938.
