= Abacetus bechynei =

Scientific classification
- Kingdom: Animalia
- Phylum: Arthropoda
- Class: Insecta
- Order: Coleoptera
- Suborder: Adephaga
- Family: Carabidae
- Genus: Abacetus
- Species: A. bechynei

Binomial name
- Abacetus bechynei Straneo, 1956

Species of ground beetle

Abacetus bechynei is a species of ground beetle in the family Carabidae.
