= Abacetus evulsus =

Scientific classification
- Kingdom: Animalia
- Phylum: Arthropoda
- Clade: Pancrustacea
- Class: Insecta
- Order: Coleoptera
- Suborder: Adephaga
- Family: Carabidae
- Genus: Abacetus
- Species: A. evulsus

Binomial name
- Abacetus evulsus Peringuey, 1904

Species of beetle

Abacetus evulsus is a species of ground beetle in the subfamily Pterostichinae. It was described by Peringuey in 1904.

== Taxonomy and Phylogeny ==
The species name evulsus is from Latin meaning 'rooted out'.

The holotype specimen was collected by Sheppard with the collection date on the 12 July 1903. A paratype was also collected by Sheppard on the 1 July 1903. The South African Museum also holds a further three undesignated specimens.

== Distribution and habitat ==
The species was originally collected from Beira in the Sofala province in Mozambique. No other locations are known.

Beira (Mozambique)
