= Abacetus longelytratus =

Scientific classification
- Kingdom: Animalia
- Phylum: Arthropoda
- Class: Insecta
- Order: Coleoptera
- Suborder: Adephaga
- Family: Carabidae
- Genus: Abacetus
- Species: A. longelytratus

Binomial name
- Abacetus longelytratus Straneo, 1951

Species of beetle

Abacetus longelytratus is a species of ground beetle in the subfamily Pterostichinae. It was described by Straneo in 1951. The species is endemic to the Democratic Republic of the Congo, with the type locality recorded as Elisabethville.
