= Abacetus picipes =

Scientific classification
- Domain: Eukaryota
- Kingdom: Animalia
- Phylum: Arthropoda
- Class: Insecta
- Order: Coleoptera
- Suborder: Adephaga
- Family: Carabidae
- Genus: Abacetus
- Species: A. picipes

Binomial name
- Abacetus picipes (Motschulsky, 1866)

Species of beetle

Abacetus picipes is a species of ground beetle in the subfamily Pterostichinae. It was described by Victor Motschulsky in 1866.
