= Abacetus rubidus =

Scientific classification
- Kingdom: Animalia
- Phylum: Arthropoda
- Class: Insecta
- Order: Coleoptera
- Suborder: Adephaga
- Family: Carabidae
- Genus: Abacetus
- Species: A. rubidus

Binomial name
- Abacetus rubidus Burgeon, 1935

Species of beetle

Abacetus rubidus is a species of ground beetle in the subfamily Pterostichinae. It was described by Burgeon in 1935.
