= Abacetus anjouaniananus =

Scientific classification
- Kingdom: Animalia
- Phylum: Arthropoda
- Class: Insecta
- Order: Coleoptera
- Suborder: Adephaga
- Family: Carabidae
- Genus: Abacetus
- Species: A. anjouaniananus

Binomial name
- Abacetus anjouaniananus Straneo, 1973

Species of insect

Abacetus anjouaniananus is a species of ground beetle in the subfamily Pterostichinae. It was described by Straneo in 1973 and is an endemic species found in Madagascar, Africa.
