= Abacetus archambaulti =

Scientific classification
- Kingdom: Animalia
- Phylum: Arthropoda
- Class: Insecta
- Order: Coleoptera
- Suborder: Adephaga
- Family: Carabidae
- Genus: Abacetus
- Species: A. archambaulti

Binomial name
- Abacetus archambaulti Straneo, 1955

Species of beetle

Abacetus archambaulti is a species of ground beetle in the subfamily Pterostichinae. It was described by Straneo in 1955 and is found in Chad, Côte d'Ivoire and Mauritania.
