= Abacetus usagarensis =

Scientific classification
- Domain: Eukaryota
- Kingdom: Animalia
- Phylum: Arthropoda
- Class: Insecta
- Order: Coleoptera
- Suborder: Adephaga
- Family: Carabidae
- Genus: Abacetus
- Species: A. usagarensis

Binomial name
- Abacetus usagarensis (Ancey, 1882)

Species of beetle

Abacetus usagarensis is a species of ground beetle in the subfamily Pterostichinae. It was described by Ancey in 1882.
