= A. annamensis =

A. annamensis may refer to:

- Abacetus annamensis, a ground beetle found in Vietnam
- Acalolepta annamensis, a longhorn beetle found in Vietnam
- Aegithalos annamensis, a synonym of Aegithalos concinnus, the black-throated bushtit, a bird found in Southeast Asia
- Agelasta annamensis, a longhorn beetle found in Vietnam
- Agkistrodon annamensis or Ancistrodon annamensis, a synonym of Calloselasma rhodostoma, a pit viper found in Southeast Asia
- Alcippe annamensis, a synonym of Alcippe peracensis, the mountain fulvetta, a bird found in Southeast Asia
- Alstonia annamensis, a plant found in Vietnam
- Annamemys annamensis, the Vietnamese pond turtle
- Arachnis annamensis, an orchid found in Vietnam
- Astathes annamensis, a longhorn beetle found in Vietnam
