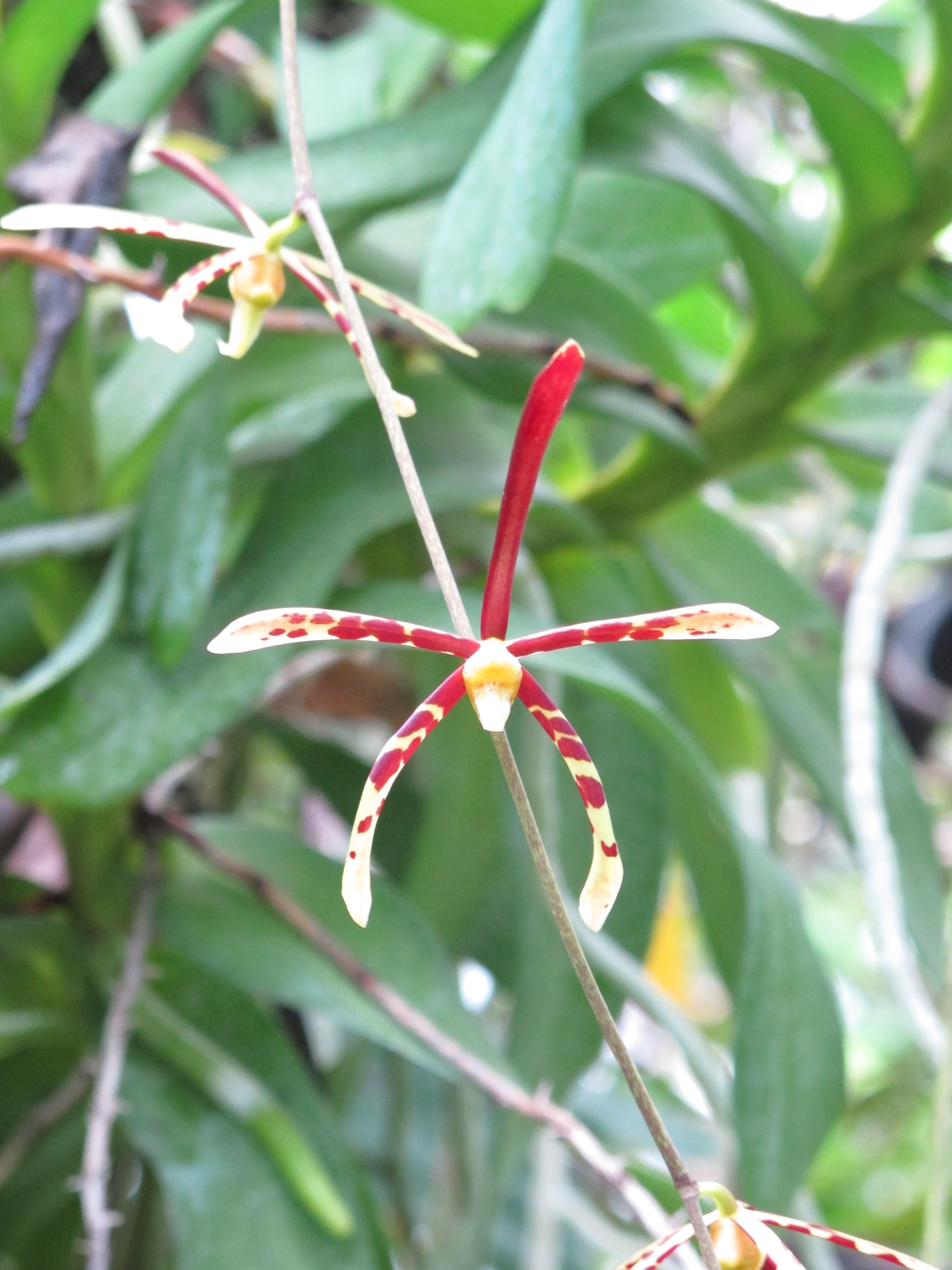
- Inflorescence detail of Arachnis longisepala
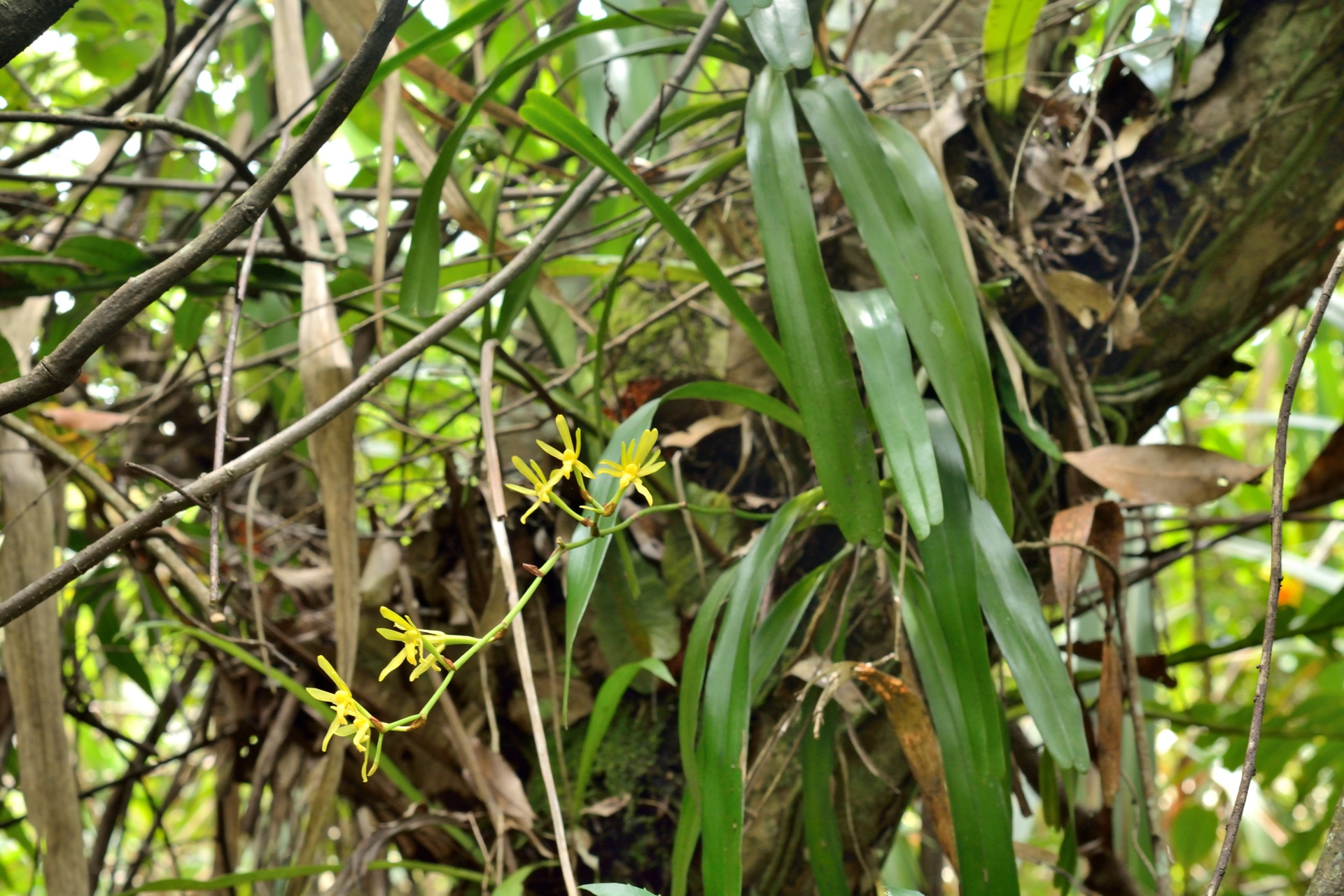
- Flowering Arachnis labrosa specimen

Scientific classification
- Kingdom: Plantae
- Clade: Tracheophytes
- Clade: Angiosperms
- Clade: Monocots
- Order: Asparagales
- Family: Orchidaceae
- Subfamily: Epidendroideae
- Tribe: Vandeae
- Subtribe: Aeridinae
- Genus: Arachnis; Blume

Type species
- Arachnis flos-aeris (L.) Rchb.f.

Synonyms
- Arachnanthe Blume; Arhynchium Lindl.; Armodorum Breda; Esmeralda Rchb.f.

= Arachnis (plant) =

Genus of orchids

The genus Arachnis, abbreviated as Arach in horticultural trade, (common name scorpion orchid,) is a member of the orchid family (Orchidaceae), consisting of more than 20 species native to China, India, Southeast Asia, Indonesia, the Philippines, New Guinea, and the Solomon Islands.

== Description ==
=== Vegetative characteristics ===
The appearance of the monopodial, epiphytic herbs of the genus Arachnis is characterized by distichously arranged, linear leaves. The vining plants may grow into a dense thicket. Arachnis does not produce pseudobulbs.

=== Generative characteristics ===
The flowers are thought to resemble spiders, and they are fragrant. The fragrance has been described as musky.

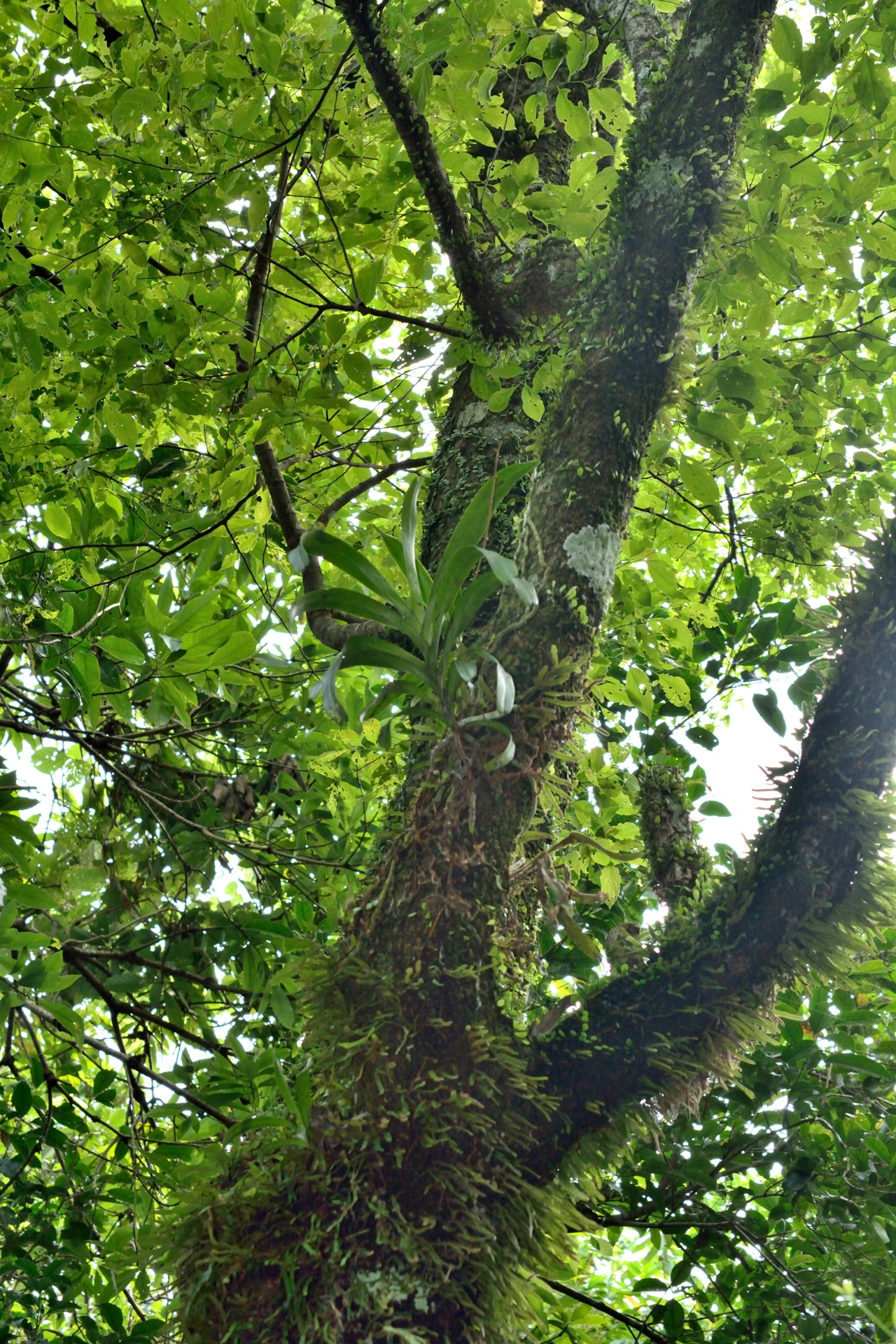
Arachnis labrosa growing epiphytically on a tree

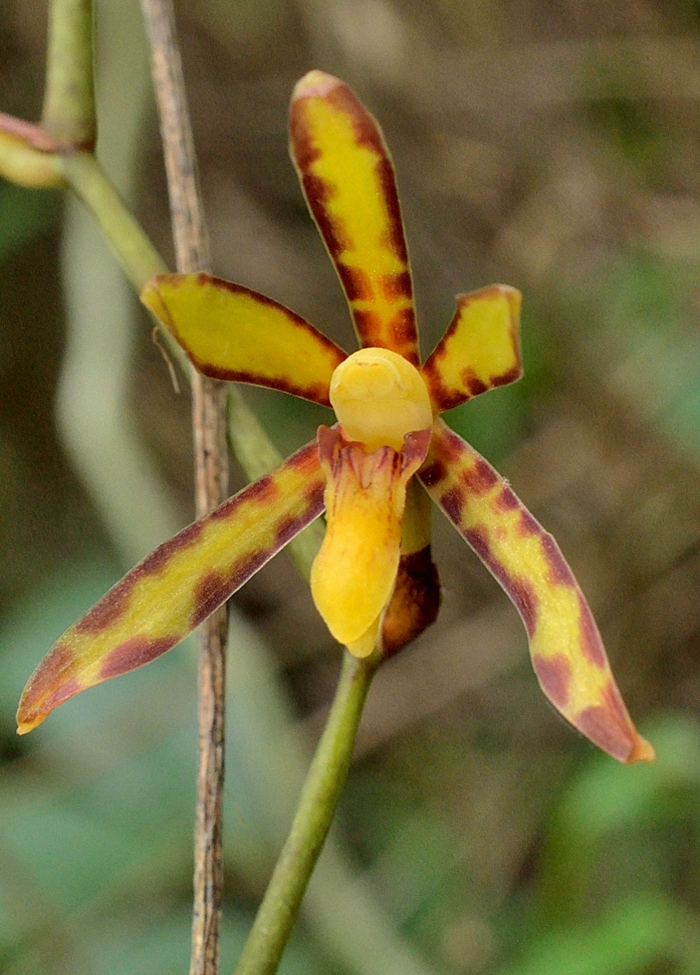
Detail of Arachnis labrosa flower

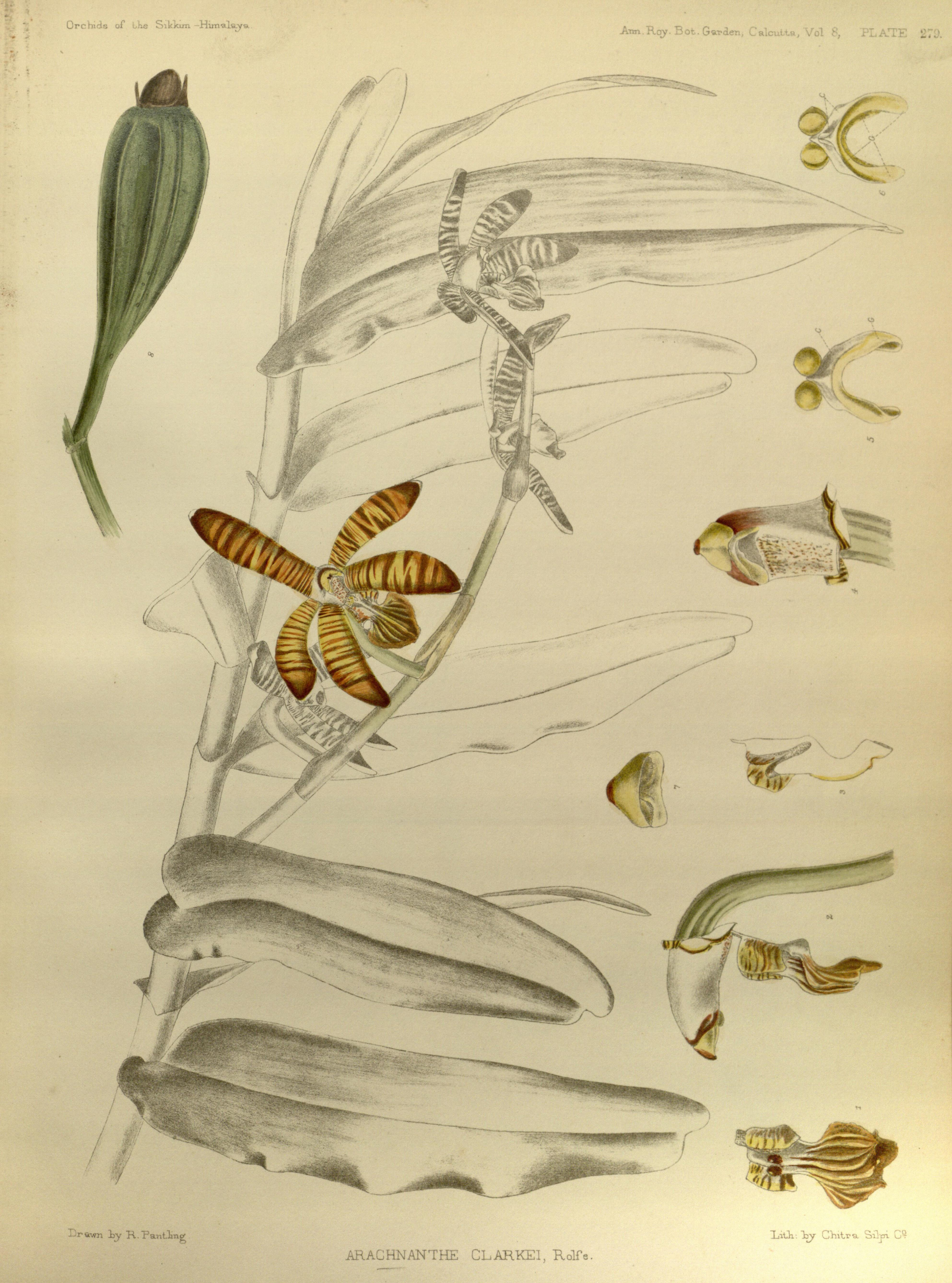
Botanical illustration of Arachnis clarkei

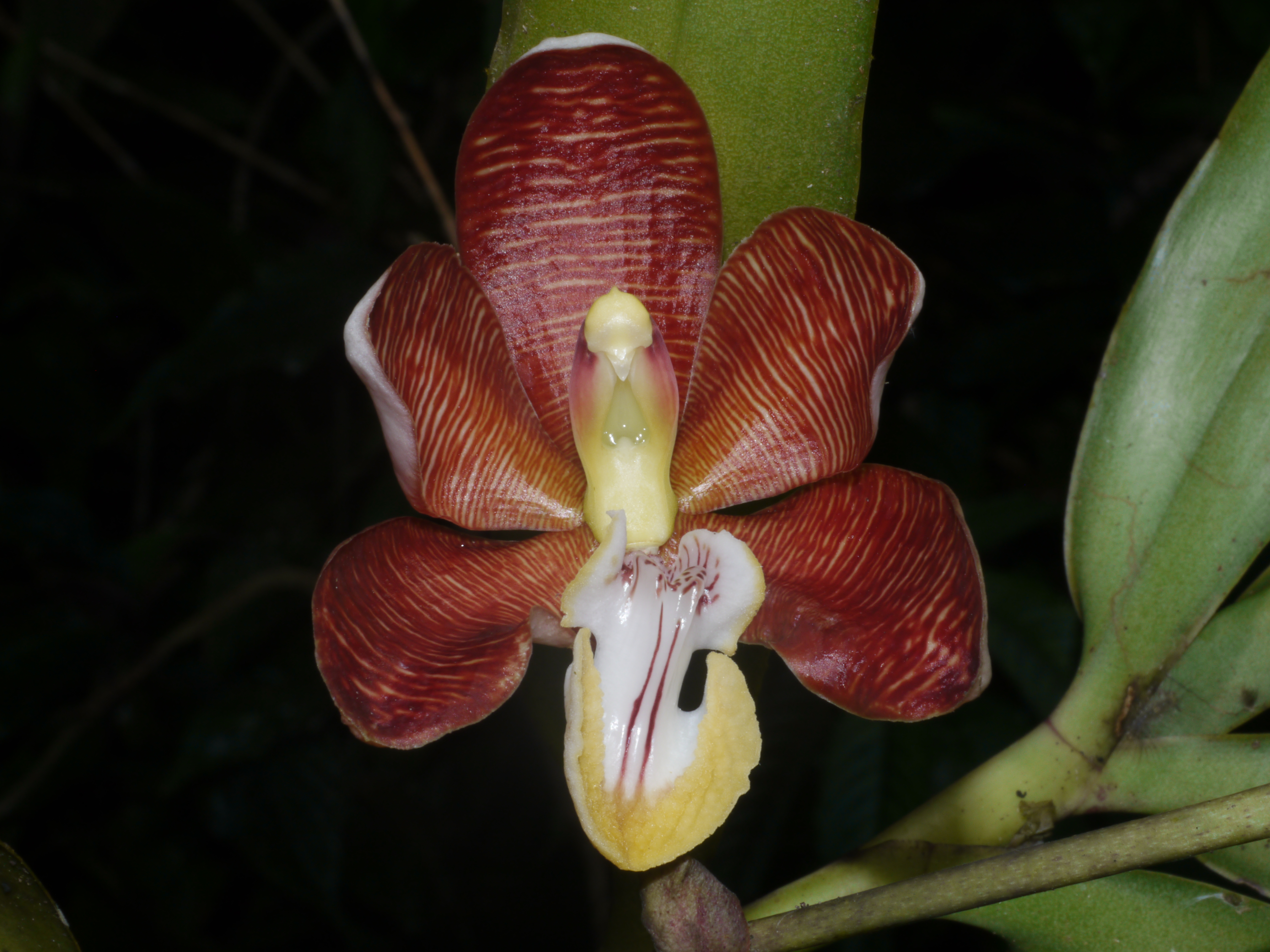
Detail of Arachnis cathcartii flower

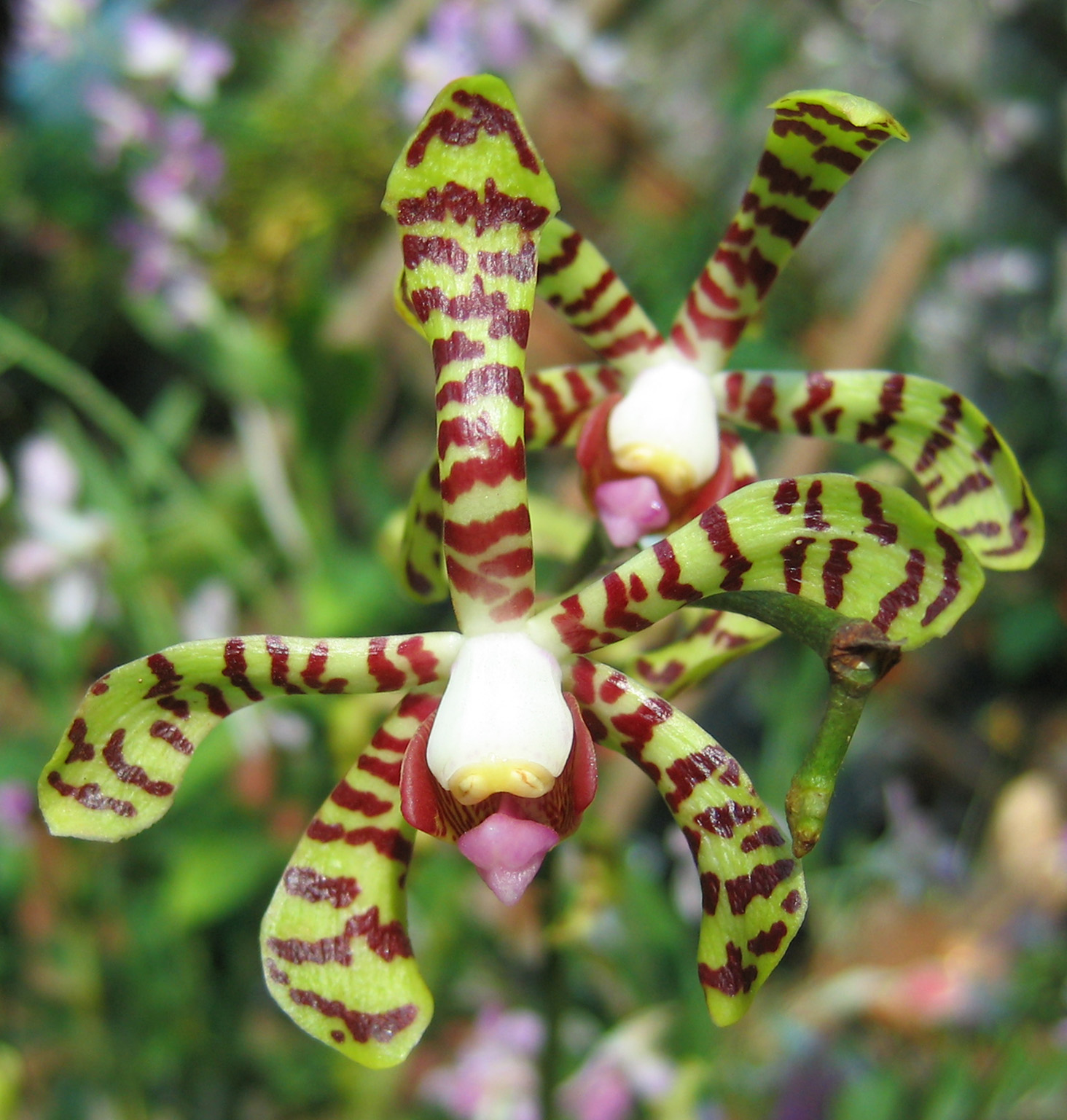
Detail of Arachnis flos-aeris flower

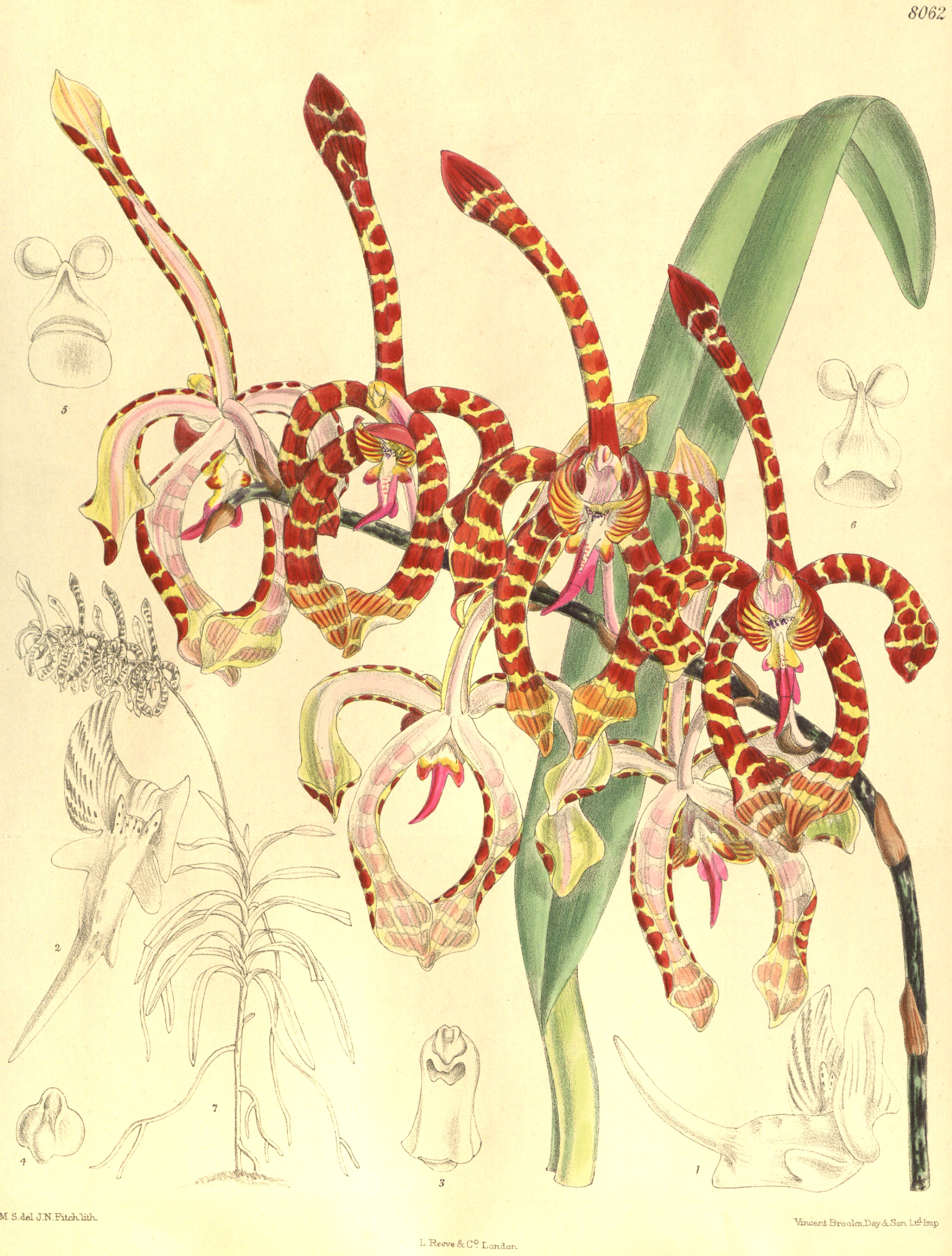
Botanical illustration of Arachnis annamensis

== Etymology ==
The generic epithet Arachnis is derived from the Greek word arachne for spider.

== Ecology ==
=== Habitat ===
Arachnis senapatiana has been found growing in subtropical broad-leaved forests at elevations of 1747 m above sea level.

=== Flowering ===
Arachnis senapatiana is known to flower in June.

== Taxonomy ==
=== Accepted species ===
There are currently 16 accepted species, including one natural hybrid:

- Arachnis annamensis (Rolfe) J.J.Sm.
- Arachnis bella (Rchb.f.) J.J.Sm.
- Arachnis bouffordii Ormerod
- Arachnis calcarata Holttum
- Arachnis cathcartii (Lindl.) J.J.Sm.
- Arachnis clarkei (Rchb.f.) J.J.Sm.
- Arachnis flos-aeris (L.) Rchb.f.
- Arachnis grandisepala J.J.Wood
- Arachnis hookeriana (Rchb.f.) Rchb.f.
- Arachnis labrosa (Lindl. & Paxton) Rchb.f.
- Arachnis limax Seidenf.
- Arachnis longisepala (J.J.Wood) Shim & A.Lamb
- Arachnis × maingayi (Hook.f.) Schltr.
- Arachnis senapatiana (Phukan & A.A.Mao) Kocyan & Schuit.
- Arachnis seramensis (Ormerod) R.Rice
- Arachnis siamensis (Schltr.) Tang & F.T.Wang
- Arachnis sulingi (Blume) Rchb.f.

=== Species formerly placed in Arachnis ===
- Arachnis beccarii Rchb.f. is now considered to be Dimorphorchis beccarii (Rchb.f.) Kocyan & Schuit.
- Arachnis breviscapa (J.J.Sm.) J.J.Sm. is now considered to be Dimorphorchis breviscapa (J.J.Sm.) Kocyan & Schuit.
- Arachnis celebica (Schltr.) J.J.Sm. is now considered to be Dimorphorchis celebica (Schltr.) Ormerod
- Arachnis imthurnii (Rolfe) L.O.Williams is now considered to be Dimorphorchis beccarii var. imthurnii (Rolfe) Kocyan & Schuit.
- Arachnis longicaulis (Schltr.) L.O.Williams is now considered to be Dimorphorchis breviscapa (J.J.Sm.) Kocyan & Schuit.
- Arachnis lowii (Lindl.) Rchb.f. is now considered to be Dimorphorchis lowii (Lindl.) Rolfe
- Arachnis lyonii Ames is now considered to be Dimorphorchis lyonii (Ames) Ormerod
- Arachnis muelleri (Kraenzl.) J.J.Sm. is now considered to be Dimorphorchis beccarii var. beccarii
- Arachnis philippinensis (Lindl.) Ames is now considered to be Trichoglottis philippinensis Lindl.
- Arachnis rohaniana (Rchb.f.) Rchb.f. is now considered to be Dimorphorchis rohaniana (Rchb.f.) P.J.Cribb
- Arachnis beccarii var. imthurnii (Rolfe) K.W.Tan is now considered to be Dimorphorchis beccarii var. imthurnii (Rolfe) Kocyan & Schuit.
- Arachnis longicaulis f. flavescens Valmayor & D.Tiu is now considered to be Dimorphorchis breviscapa (J.J.Sm.) Kocyan & Schuit.

== Conservation ==
Arachnis has become extinct in Nansei-shoto.

== Horticulture ==
It can be cultivated under warm and moist conditions growing in pots, baskets, or mounted on slabs.
