= Agelasta humeralis =

Scientific classification
- Domain: Eukaryota
- Kingdom: Animalia
- Phylum: Arthropoda
- Class: Insecta
- Order: Coleoptera
- Suborder: Polyphaga
- Infraorder: Cucujiformia
- Family: Cerambycidae
- Genus: Agelasta
- Species: A. humeralis

Binomial name
- Agelasta humeralis (Gahan, 1894)

Synonyms
- Mesolophus humeralis Gahan, 1894

Species of beetle

Agelasta humeralis is a species of beetle in the family Cerambycidae. It was described by Charles Joseph Gahan in 1894. It is known from Myanmar.
