= Agelasta birmanica =

Scientific classification
- Kingdom: Animalia
- Phylum: Arthropoda
- Class: Insecta
- Order: Coleoptera
- Suborder: Polyphaga
- Infraorder: Cucujiformia
- Family: Cerambycidae
- Genus: Agelasta
- Species: A. birmanica

Binomial name
- Agelasta birmanica (Breuning, 1935)

Synonyms
- Paragelasta birmanica Breuning, 1935

Species of beetle

Agelasta birmanica is a species of beetle in the family Cerambycidae. It was described by Stephan von Breuning in 1935. It is known from Myanmar, Laos, Vietnam, and Thailand.
