= Agelasta mima =

Scientific classification
- Kingdom: Animalia
- Phylum: Arthropoda
- Class: Insecta
- Order: Coleoptera
- Suborder: Polyphaga
- Infraorder: Cucujiformia
- Family: Cerambycidae
- Genus: Agelasta
- Species: A. mima

Binomial name
- Agelasta mima (J. Thomson, 1868)

Synonyms
- Anthriboscyla mima J. Thomson, 1868; Mesosa mima (J. Thomson, 1868)

Species of beetle

Agelasta mima is a species of beetle in the family Cerambycidae. It was described by James Thomson in 1868. It is known from Borneo and Malaysia.
