= Agelasta pardalina =

Scientific classification
- Domain: Eukaryota
- Kingdom: Animalia
- Phylum: Arthropoda
- Class: Insecta
- Order: Coleoptera
- Suborder: Polyphaga
- Infraorder: Cucujiformia
- Family: Cerambycidae
- Genus: Agelasta
- Species: A. pardalina

Binomial name
- Agelasta pardalina Heller, 1924

Species of beetle

Agelasta pardalina is a species of beetle in the family Cerambycidae. It was described by Heller in 1924. It is known from the Philippines.

== Subspecies ==
- Agelasta pardalina pardalina Heller, 1924
- Agelasta pardalina subana Heller, 1924
