= Agelasta yonaguni =

Scientific classification
- Kingdom: Animalia
- Phylum: Arthropoda
- Class: Insecta
- Order: Coleoptera
- Suborder: Polyphaga
- Infraorder: Cucujiformia
- Family: Cerambycidae
- Genus: Agelasta
- Species: A. yonaguni

Binomial name
- Agelasta yonaguni (Hayashi, 1962)

Synonyms
- Mesosa yonaguni Hayashi, 1962

Species of beetle

Agelasta yonaguni is a species of beetle in the family Cerambycidae. It was described by Masao Hayashi in 1962. It is known from Japan.

== Subspecies ==
- Agelasta yonaguni kashiwaii (Kusama & Takakuwa, 1984)
- Agelasta yonaguni similaris (Kusama & Takakuwa, 1984)
- Agelasta yonaguni subkonoi (Breuning, 1964)
- Agelasta yonaguni yonaguni (Hayashi, 1962)
