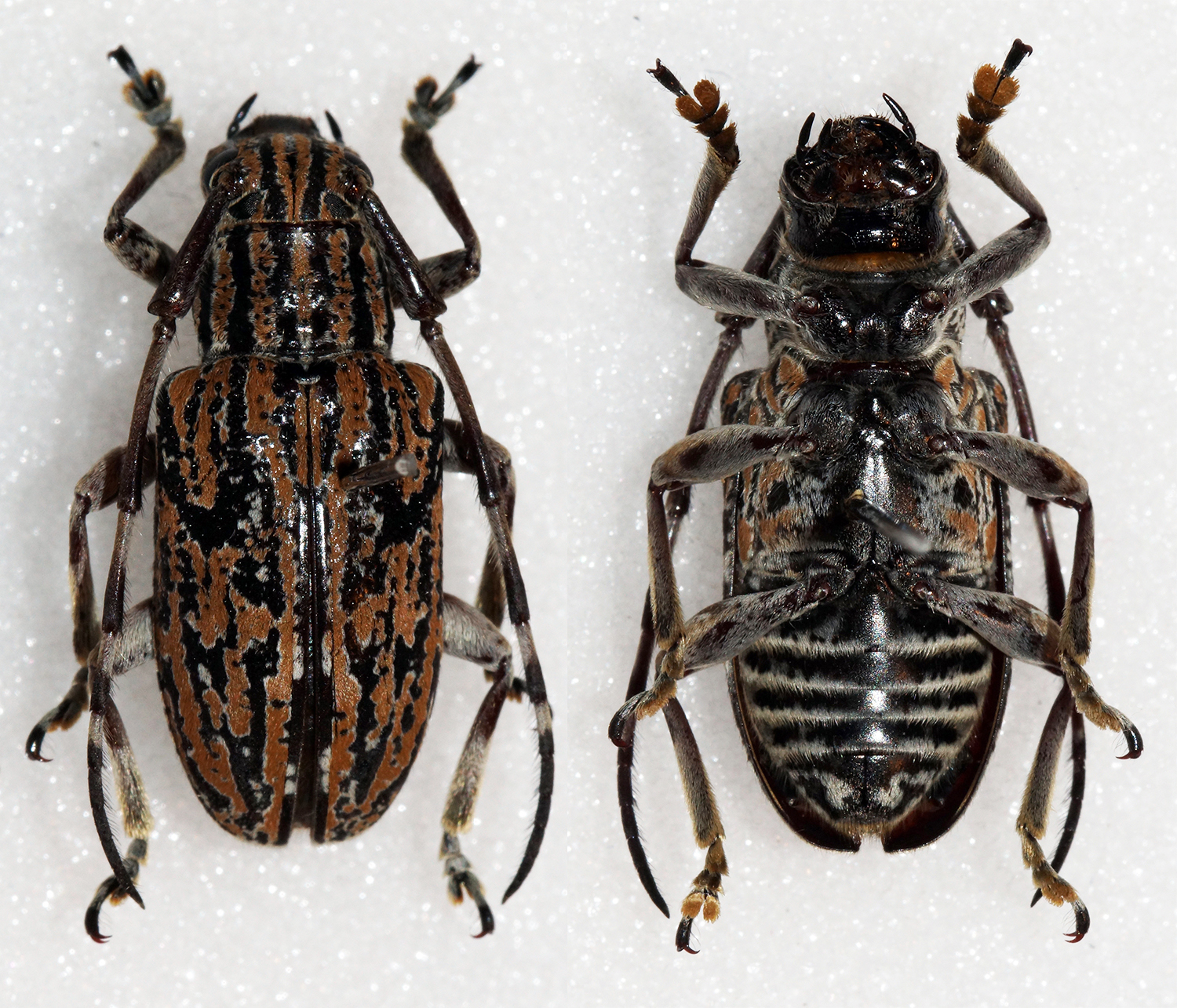

Scientific classification
- Kingdom: Animalia
- Phylum: Arthropoda
- Class: Insecta
- Order: Coleoptera
- Suborder: Polyphaga
- Infraorder: Cucujiformia
- Family: Cerambycidae
- Genus: Agelasta
- Species: A. lecideosa

Binomial name
- Agelasta lecideosa (Pascoe, 1865)

Synonyms
- Anthriboscyla lecideosa (Pascoe, 1865); Coptops lecideosa Pascoe, 1865; Mesosa (Anthriboscyla) lecideosa (Pascoe, 1865)

= Agelasta lecideosa =

Species of beetle

Agelasta lecideosa is a species of beetle in the family Cerambycidae. It was described by Francis Polkinghorne Pascoe in 1865. It is known from Borneo, Malaysia and Sumatra.
