= Agelasta birmanensis =

Scientific classification
- Kingdom: Animalia
- Phylum: Arthropoda
- Class: Insecta
- Order: Coleoptera
- Suborder: Polyphaga
- Infraorder: Cucujiformia
- Family: Cerambycidae
- Genus: Agelasta
- Species: A. birmanensis

Binomial name
- Agelasta birmanensis (Breuning, 1935)

Synonyms
- Samiomimus birmanensis Breuning, 1935

Species of beetle

Agelasta birmanensis is a species of beetle in the family Cerambycidae. It was described by Stephan von Breuning in 1935. It is known from Myanmar.
