= Agelasta catenatoides =

Scientific classification
- Domain: Eukaryota
- Kingdom: Animalia
- Phylum: Arthropoda
- Class: Insecta
- Order: Coleoptera
- Suborder: Polyphaga
- Infraorder: Cucujiformia
- Family: Cerambycidae
- Genus: Agelasta
- Species: A. catenatoides

Binomial name
- Agelasta catenatoides Yamasako & Ohbayashi, 2009

Synonyms
- Mesosa laosensis Breuning, 1935 nec Pic, 1925

Species of beetle

Agelasta catenatoides is a species of beetle in the family Cerambycidae. It was described by Yamasako and Ohbayashi in 2009. It is known from Laos.
