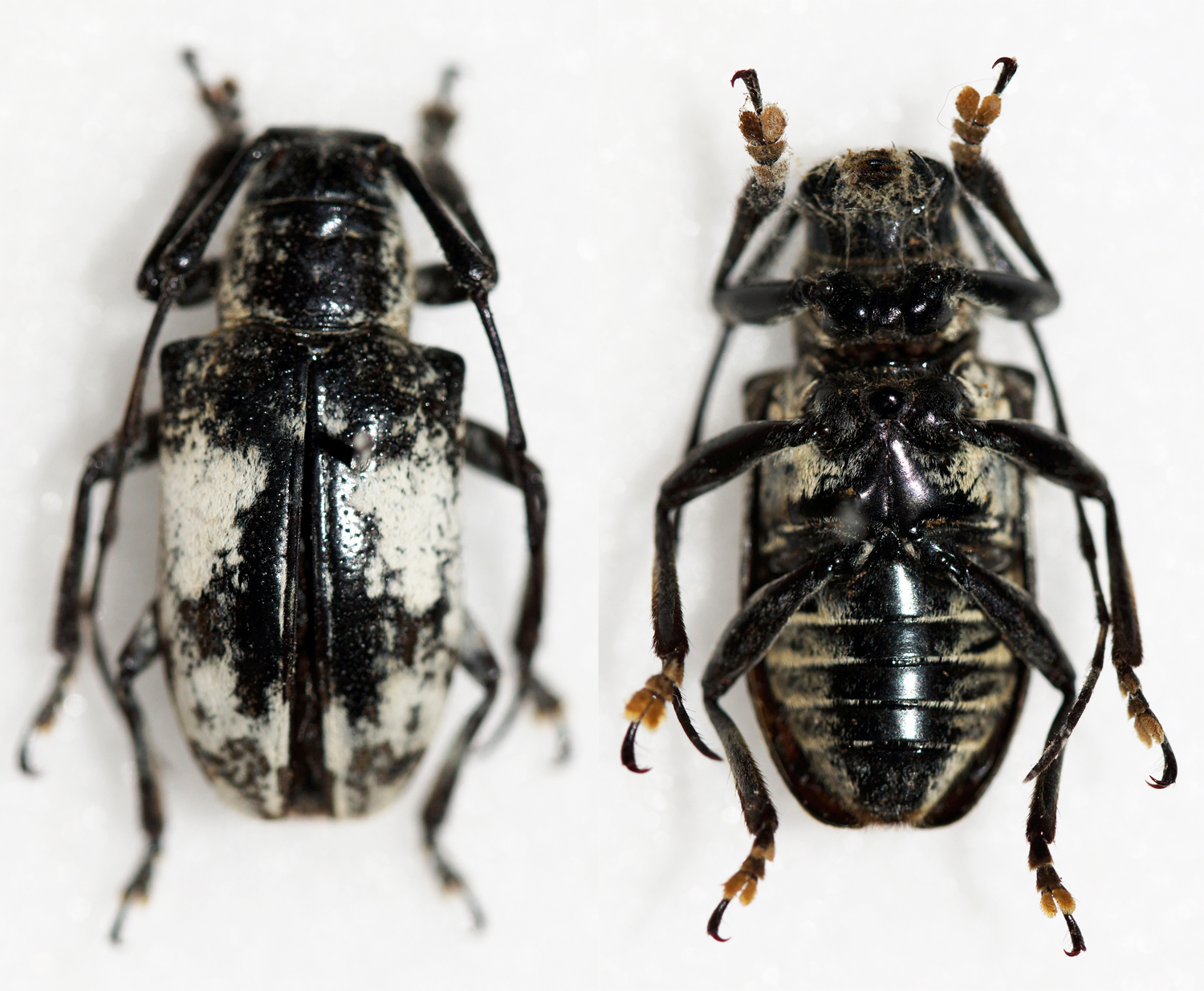

Scientific classification
- Kingdom: Animalia
- Phylum: Arthropoda
- Class: Insecta
- Order: Coleoptera
- Suborder: Polyphaga
- Infraorder: Cucujiformia
- Family: Cerambycidae
- Genus: Agelasta
- Species: A. albomarmorata

Binomial name
- Agelasta albomarmorata Breuning, 1947

= Agelasta albomarmorata =

Species of beetle

Agelasta albomarmorata is a species of beetle in the family Cerambycidae found in Asia in countries such as the Philippines.
