= Agelasta nigropunctata =

Scientific classification
- Kingdom: Animalia
- Phylum: Arthropoda
- Class: Insecta
- Order: Coleoptera
- Suborder: Polyphaga
- Infraorder: Cucujiformia
- Family: Cerambycidae
- Genus: Agelasta
- Species: A. nigropunctata

Binomial name
- Agelasta nigropunctata (Breuning, 1938)

Synonyms
- Mesosa nigropunctata Breuning, 1938

Species of beetle

Agelasta nigropunctata is a species of beetle in the family Cerambycidae. It was described by Stephan von Breuning in 1938. It is known from Myanmar.
