= Agelasta mouhotii =

Scientific classification
- Domain: Eukaryota
- Kingdom: Animalia
- Phylum: Arthropoda
- Class: Insecta
- Order: Coleoptera
- Suborder: Polyphaga
- Infraorder: Cucujiformia
- Family: Cerambycidae
- Genus: Agelasta
- Species: A. mouhotii

Binomial name
- Agelasta mouhotii Pascoe, 1862

Synonyms
- Cacia albofasciata Pic, 1917; Agelasta mouhoti Pascoe, 1862 (misspelling); Agelasta balteata Pascoe, 1866

Species of beetle

Agelasta mouhotii is a species of beetle in the family Cerambycidae. It was described by Francis Polkinghorne Pascoe in 1862. It is known from Laos, Cambodia and Vietnam.
