= Agelasta bifasciana =

Scientific classification
- Domain: Eukaryota
- Kingdom: Animalia
- Phylum: Arthropoda
- Class: Insecta
- Order: Coleoptera
- Suborder: Polyphaga
- Infraorder: Cucujiformia
- Family: Cerambycidae
- Genus: Agelasta
- Species: A. bifasciana

Binomial name
- Agelasta bifasciana (White, 1858)

Species of beetle

Agelasta bifasciana is a species of beetle in the family Cerambycidae. It was described by White in 1858. It is known from China, India, Laos and Vietnam.
