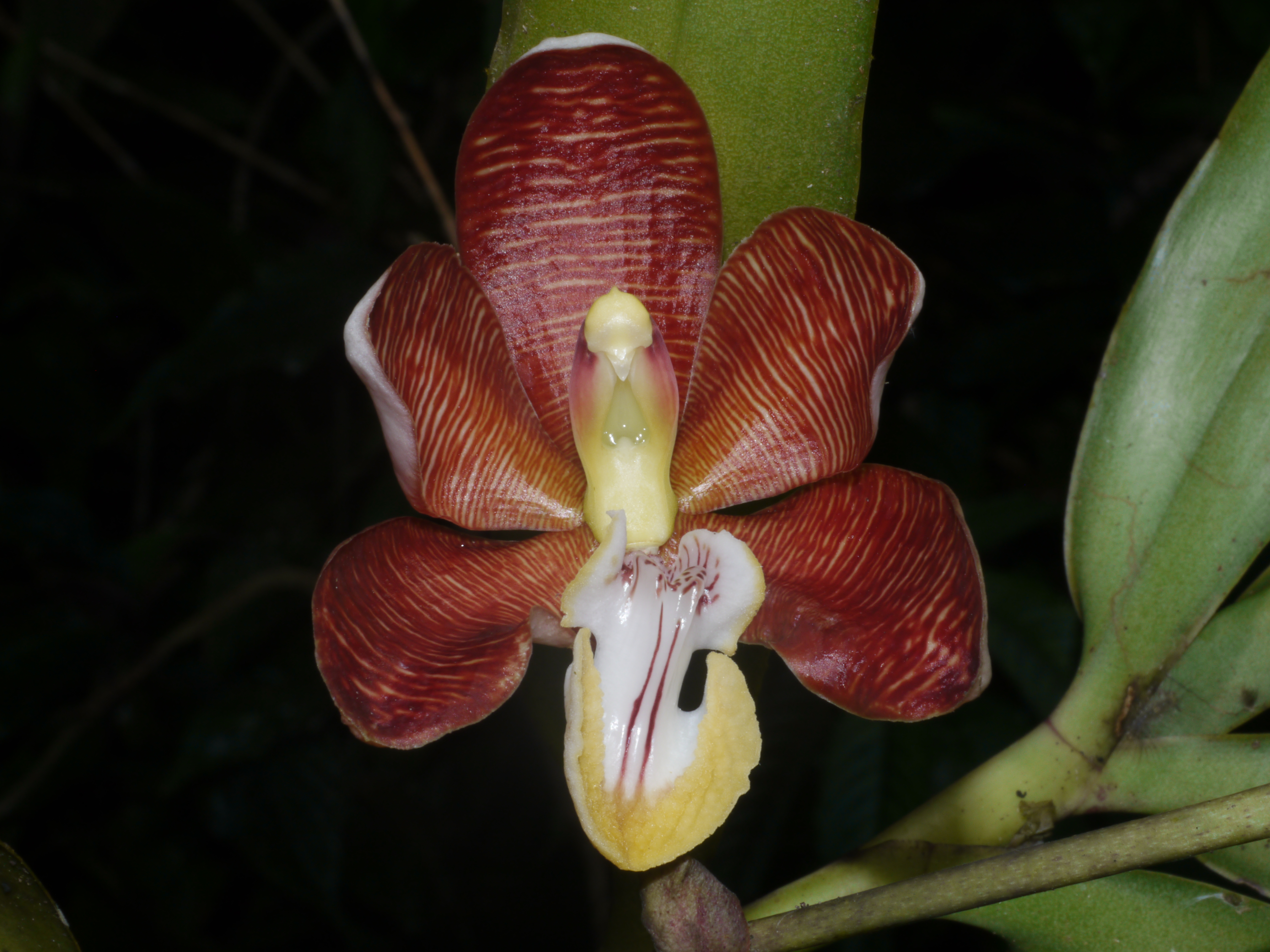
- Arachnis cathcartii in Namdapha National Park

Scientific classification
- Kingdom: Plantae
- Clade: Tracheophytes
- Clade: Angiosperms
- Clade: Monocots
- Order: Asparagales
- Family: Orchidaceae
- Subfamily: Epidendroideae
- Genus: Arachnis
- Species: A. cathcartii

Binomial name
- Arachnis cathcartii (Lindl.) J.J.Sm.

Synonyms
- Vanda cathcartii Lindl.; Arachnanthe cathcartii (Lindl.) Benth. & Hook.f.; Esmeralda cathcartii (Lindl.) Rchb.f.

= Arachnis cathcartii =

Species of orchid

Arachnis cathcartii, the red spider orchid, is an orchid native to the central and eastern Himalayas east to the mountains of northern Myanmar, where it occurs in wet tropical habitats at altitudes of 600–2000 metres. It has an unusual flower pattern, with numerous very narrow red and white horizontal bars on the five regular tepals; the sixth tepal is yellow with 2–4 longitudinal red lines.
