= Agelasta nigrostictica =

Scientific classification
- Kingdom: Animalia
- Phylum: Arthropoda
- Clade: Pancrustacea
- Class: Insecta
- Order: Coleoptera
- Suborder: Polyphaga
- Infraorder: Cucujiformia
- Family: Cerambycidae
- Genus: Agelasta
- Species: A. nigrostictica

Binomial name
- Agelasta nigrostictica (Breuning, 1967)

Synonyms
- Mesosa nigrostictica Breuning, 1967

Species of beetle

Agelasta nigrostictica is a species of beetle in the family Cerambycidae. It was described by Stephan von Breuning in 1967. It is known from Java.
