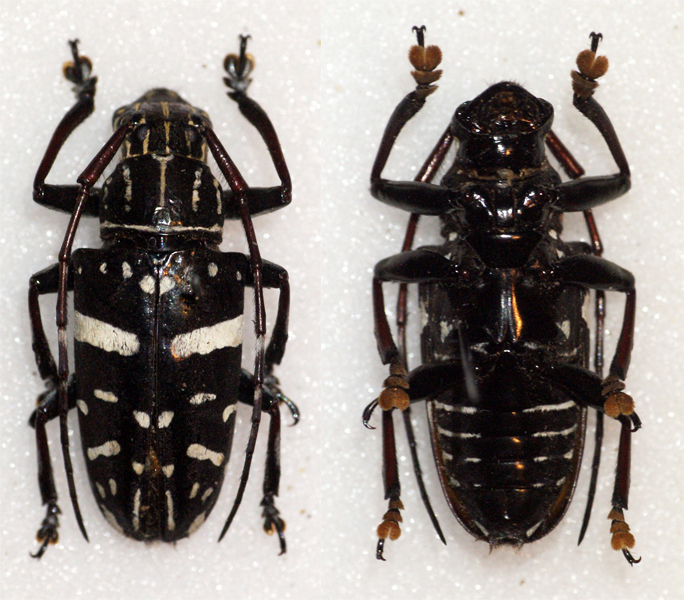
- Agelasta albomaculata

Scientific classification
- Domain: Eukaryota
- Kingdom: Animalia
- Phylum: Arthropoda
- Class: Insecta
- Order: Coleoptera
- Suborder: Polyphaga
- Infraorder: Cucujiformia
- Family: Cerambycidae
- Tribe: Mesosini
- Genus: Agelasta

Species
- See text

= Agelasta (beetle) =

Genus of beetles

Agelasta is a genus of longhorn beetles of the subfamily Lamiinae.

== Species ==
Agelasta contains the following species:

Subgenus Agelasta

- Agelasta albomaculata Breuning, 1958
- Agelasta albomarmorata Breuning, 1947
- Agelasta albostictica Breuning, 1980
- Agelasta basispreta Heller, 1923
- Agelasta estrellae Hüdepohl, 1985
- Agelasta humerata Breuning, 1939
- Agelasta imogenae Hüdepohl, 1985
- Agelasta isthmicola Heller, 1923
- Agelasta lacteospreta Heller, 1923
- Agelasta lacteostictica Breuning, 1960
- Agelasta luzonica Breuning, 1937
- Agelasta marionae Hüdepohl, 1985
- Agelasta mediofasciata Heller, 1913
- Agelasta milagrosae Hüdepohl, 1985
- Agelasta mindanaonis Breuning, 1939
- Agelasta ocellifera (Westwood, 1863)
- Agelasta pardalina Heller, 1924
- Agelasta pardalis Breuning, 1974
- Agelasta szetschuanica Breuning, 1967
- Agelasta transversa Newman, 1842
- Agelasta transversefasciata Breuning, 1939
- Agelasta transversesignata Breuning, 1939
- Agelasta undulata Breuning, 1939
- Agelasta unicolor Breuning, 1962

Subgenus Antennagelasta

- Agelasta perakensis Breuning, 1968

Subgenus Dissosira

- Agelasta albomaculata Breuning, 1957
- Agelasta andamanica (Breuning, 1935)
- Agelasta annamensis (Breuning, 1938)
- Agelasta bimaculata Breuning, 1938
- Agelasta cana Breuning, 1939
- Agelasta catenata Pascoe, 1862
- Agelasta catenatoides Yamasako & Ohbayashi, 2009
- Agelasta columba (Pascoe, 1859)
- Agelasta elongata Breuning, 1963
- Agelasta gardneri (Breuning, 1938)
- Agelasta griseonotata Pic, 1944
- Agelasta illecideosa (Breuning, 1967)
- Agelasta konoi (Hayashi, 1956)
- Agelasta kumei (Takakuwa, 1991)
- Agelasta lecideosa (Pascoe, 1865)
- Agelasta mima (J. Thomson, 1868)
- Agelasta mixta Gahan, 1895
- Agelasta mouhotii Pascoe, 1862
- Agelasta nigrolineata Breuning, 1968
- Agelasta nigromaculata Gahan, 1894
- Agelasta nigropunctata (Breuning, 1938)
- Agelasta nigrostictica (Breuning, 1967)
- Agelasta perplexa (Pascoe, 1858)
- Agelasta postvittata Breuning, 1939
- Agelasta praelongipes (Kusama & Irie, 1976)
- Agelasta quadrimaculata (Gahan, 1890)
- Agelasta riouensis (Breuning, 1935)
- Agelasta rufa (Breuning, 1935)
- Agelasta siamana (Breuning, 1974)
- Agelasta siamensis Breuning, 1956
- Agelasta sikkimensis Breuning, 1963
- Agelasta tonkinea Pic, 1925
- Agelasta villosipes Breuning, 1939
- Agelasta yonaguni (Hayashi, 1962)
- Agelasta yunnanensis Breuning, 1954

Subgenus Epagelasta

- Agelasta balteata Pascoe, 1866
- Agelasta newmanni White, 1856

Subgenus Mesolophus

- Agelasta annamana Breuning, 1956
- Agelasta birmanensis (Breuning, 1935)
- Agelasta cameroni Breuning, 1978
- Agelasta dayremi Breuning, 1938
- Agelasta densemarmorata Breuning, 1968
- Agelasta humeralis (Gahan, 1894)
- Agelasta marmorata (Pic, 1927)
- Agelasta pici Breuning, 1938
- Agelasta striata Hüdepohl, 1990
- Agelasta yunnana Chiang, 1963

Subgenus Metagelasta

- Agelasta albomaculata (Aurivillius, 1920)
- Agelasta basimaculata Heller, 1934
- Agelasta basimaculatoides Breuning, 1980

Subgenus Paragelasta

- Agelasta robinsoni (Gahan, 1906)

Subgenus Parasaimia

- Agelasta alboplagiata (Breuning, 1935)
- Agelasta glabrofasciata (Pic, 1917)
- Agelasta laosensis (Pic, 1925)
- Agelasta latefasciata Breuning, 1939

Subgenus Pseudagelasta

- Agelasta bifasciana (White, 1858)
- Agelasta birmanica (Breuning, 1935)
- Agelasta cristata Breuning, 1938
- Agelasta fallaciosa Breuning, 1939
- Agelasta hirsutula Breuning, 1939

Incertae sedis

- Agelasta obscura McLeay, 1884
