= Agelasta obscura =

Scientific classification
- Domain: Eukaryota
- Kingdom: Animalia
- Phylum: Arthropoda
- Class: Insecta
- Order: Coleoptera
- Suborder: Polyphaga
- Infraorder: Cucujiformia
- Family: Cerambycidae
- Genus: Agelasta
- Species: A. obscura

Binomial name
- Agelasta obscura McLeay, 1884

Synonyms
- Choeromorpha obscura (McLeay) Aurivillius

Species of beetle

Agelasta obscura is a species of beetle in the family Cerambycidae. It was described by McLeay in 1884.
