= Agelasta columba =

Scientific classification
- Kingdom: Animalia
- Phylum: Arthropoda
- Class: Insecta
- Order: Coleoptera
- Suborder: Polyphaga
- Infraorder: Cucujiformia
- Family: Cerambycidae
- Genus: Agelasta
- Species: A. columba

Binomial name
- Agelasta columba (Pascoe, 1859)

Synonyms
- Mesosa columba Pascoe, 1859

Species of beetle

Agelasta columba is a species of beetle in the family Cerambycidae. It was described by Francis Polkinghorne Pascoe in 1859. It is known from Sri Lanka.
