= Agelasta robinsoni =

Scientific classification
- Domain: Eukaryota
- Kingdom: Animalia
- Phylum: Arthropoda
- Class: Insecta
- Order: Coleoptera
- Suborder: Polyphaga
- Infraorder: Cucujiformia
- Family: Cerambycidae
- Genus: Agelasta
- Species: A. robinsoni

Binomial name
- Agelasta robinsoni (Gahan, 1906)

Synonyms
- Choeromorpha robinsoni Gahan, 1906

Species of beetle

Agelasta robinsoni is a species of beetle in the family Cerambycidae. It was described by Charles Joseph Gahan in 1906. It is known from Malaysia.
