= Agelasta catenata =

Scientific classification
- Kingdom: Animalia
- Phylum: Arthropoda
- Class: Insecta
- Order: Coleoptera
- Suborder: Polyphaga
- Infraorder: Cucujiformia
- Family: Cerambycidae
- Genus: Agelasta
- Species: A. catenata

Binomial name
- Agelasta catenata Pascoe, 1862

Synonyms
- Choeromorpha postmaculata Pic, 1936; Dissosira dubiosa Breuning, 1938

Species of beetle

Agelasta catenata is a species of beetle in the family Cerambycidae. It was described by Francis Polkinghorne Pascoe in 1862. It is known from Malaysia, Cambodia, Laos, Borneo and Vietnam. It contains the varietas Agelasta catenata var. infasciata.
