= Agelasta mixta =

Scientific classification
- Domain: Eukaryota
- Kingdom: Animalia
- Phylum: Arthropoda
- Class: Insecta
- Order: Coleoptera
- Suborder: Polyphaga
- Infraorder: Cucujiformia
- Family: Cerambycidae
- Genus: Agelasta
- Species: A. mixta

Binomial name
- Agelasta mixta Gahan, 1895

Species of beetle

Agelasta mixta is a species of beetle in the family Cerambycidae. It was described by Charles Joseph Gahan in 1895. It is known from Myanmar.
