= Agelasta marmorata =

Scientific classification
- Kingdom: Animalia
- Phylum: Arthropoda
- Class: Insecta
- Order: Coleoptera
- Suborder: Polyphaga
- Infraorder: Cucujiformia
- Family: Cerambycidae
- Genus: Agelasta
- Species: A. marmorata

Binomial name
- Agelasta marmorata (Pic, 1927)

Synonyms
- Samiomimus marmoratus Pic, 1927

Species of beetle

Agelasta marmorata is a species of beetle in the family Cerambycidae. It was described by Maurice Pic in 1927. It is known from Laos, China and Vietnam.
