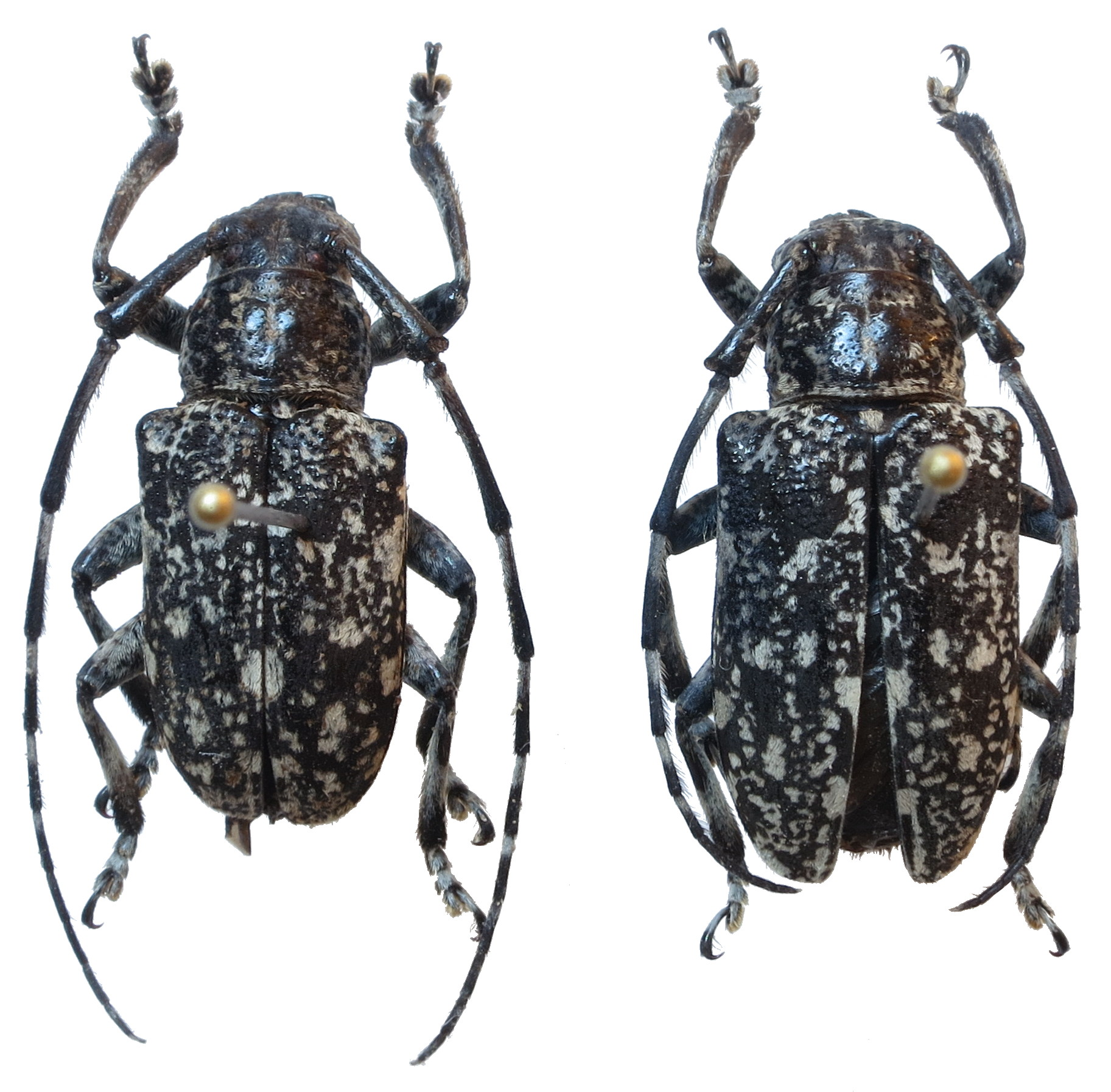
- A. lacteospreta pair from Philippines

Scientific classification
- Domain: Eukaryota
- Kingdom: Animalia
- Phylum: Arthropoda
- Class: Insecta
- Order: Coleoptera
- Suborder: Polyphaga
- Infraorder: Cucujiformia
- Family: Cerambycidae
- Genus: Agelasta
- Species: A. lacteospreta

Binomial name
- Agelasta lacteospreta Heller, 1923

Synonyms
- Agelasta lactospreta (Heller) Hüdepohl, 1985 (misspelling)

= Agelasta lacteospreta =

Species of beetle

Agelasta lacteospreta is a species of beetle in the family Cerambycidae. It was described by Heller in 1923. It is known from the Philippines.
