= Agelasta laosensis =

Scientific classification
- Kingdom: Animalia
- Phylum: Arthropoda
- Class: Insecta
- Order: Coleoptera
- Suborder: Polyphaga
- Infraorder: Cucujiformia
- Family: Cerambycidae
- Genus: Agelasta
- Species: A. laosensis

Binomial name
- Agelasta laosensis (Pic, 1925)

Synonyms
- Mimocoptops laosensis Pic, 1925

Species of beetle

Agelasta laosensis is a species of beetle in the family Cerambycidae. It was described by Maurice Pic in 1925. It is known from Laos.
