= Agelasta humerata =

Scientific classification
- Kingdom: Animalia
- Phylum: Arthropoda
- Class: Insecta
- Order: Coleoptera
- Suborder: Polyphaga
- Infraorder: Cucujiformia
- Family: Cerambycidae
- Genus: Agelasta
- Species: A. humerata

Binomial name
- Agelasta humerata Breuning, 1939

Synonyms
- Agelasta humeralis Heller, 1924

Species of beetle

Agelasta humerata is a species of beetle in the family Cerambycidae. It was described by Stephan von Breuning in 1939. Its known species were found in the Philippines.
