= Agelasta gardneri =

Scientific classification
- Kingdom: Animalia
- Phylum: Arthropoda
- Class: Insecta
- Order: Coleoptera
- Suborder: Polyphaga
- Infraorder: Cucujiformia
- Family: Cerambycidae
- Genus: Agelasta
- Species: A. gardneri

Binomial name
- Agelasta gardneri (Breuning, 1938)

Synonyms
- Mesosa annamensis Breuning, 1939; Mesosa gardneri Breuning, 1938

Species of beetle

Agelasta gardneri is a species of beetle in the family Cerambycidae. It was described by Stephan von Breuning in 1938. It is known from India and Vietnam.
