= Agelasta transversa =

Scientific classification
- Domain: Eukaryota
- Kingdom: Animalia
- Phylum: Arthropoda
- Class: Insecta
- Order: Coleoptera
- Suborder: Polyphaga
- Infraorder: Cucujiformia
- Family: Cerambycidae
- Genus: Agelasta
- Species: A. transversa

Binomial name
- Agelasta transversa Newman, 1842

Species of beetle

Agelasta transversa is a species of beetle in the family Cerambycidae. It was described by Newman in 1842. It is known from the Philippines.
