= Agelasta balteata =

Scientific classification
- Kingdom: Animalia
- Phylum: Arthropoda
- Clade: Pancrustacea
- Class: Insecta
- Order: Coleoptera
- Suborder: Polyphaga
- Infraorder: Cucujiformia
- Family: Cerambycidae
- Genus: Agelasta
- Species: A. balteata

Binomial name
- Agelasta balteata Pascoe, 1866

Species of beetle

Agelasta balteata is a species of beetle in the family Cerambycidae. It was described by Francis Polkinghorne Pascoe in 1866. It is known from Malaysia, Java, and Sumatra. It contains the varietas Agelasta balteata var. niasica.
