= Agelasta sikkimensis =

Scientific classification
- Kingdom: Animalia
- Phylum: Arthropoda
- Class: Insecta
- Order: Coleoptera
- Suborder: Polyphaga
- Infraorder: Cucujiformia
- Family: Cerambycidae
- Genus: Agelasta
- Species: A. sikkimensis

Binomial name
- Agelasta sikkimensis Breuning, 1963

Species of beetle

Agelasta sikkimensis is a species of beetle in the family Cerambycidae. It was described by Stephan von Breuning in 1963. It is known from India.
