= Agelasta cristata =

Scientific classification
- Kingdom: Animalia
- Phylum: Arthropoda
- Class: Insecta
- Order: Coleoptera
- Suborder: Polyphaga
- Infraorder: Cucujiformia
- Family: Cerambycidae
- Genus: Agelasta
- Species: A. cristata

Binomial name
- Agelasta cristata Breuning, 1938

Species of beetle

Agelasta cristata is a species of beetle in the family Cerambycidae. It was described by Stephan von Breuning in 1938. It is often found in/endemic to Myanmar.
