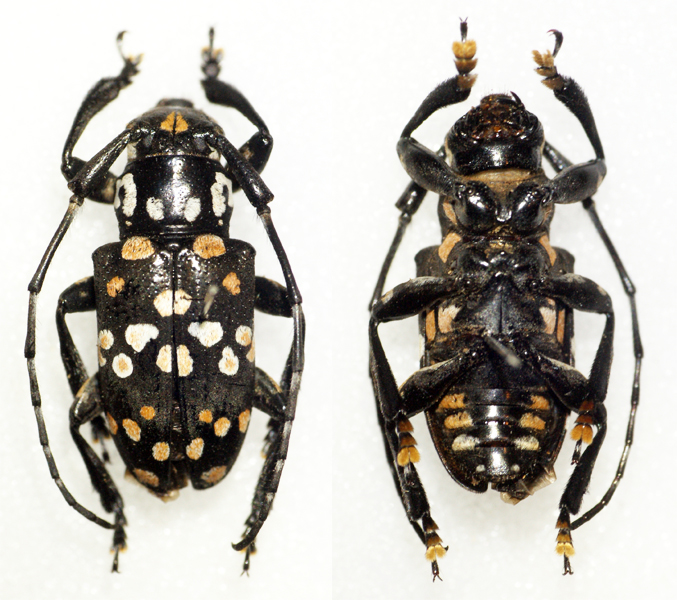

Scientific classification
- Kingdom: Animalia
- Phylum: Arthropoda
- Class: Insecta
- Order: Coleoptera
- Suborder: Polyphaga
- Infraorder: Cucujiformia
- Family: Cerambycidae
- Genus: Agelasta
- Species: A. ocellifera

Binomial name
- Agelasta ocellifera (Westwood, 1863)

Synonyms
- Agelasta roseomaculata Breuning, 1947; Lamia ocellifera Westwood, 1863

= Agelasta ocellifera =

Species of beetle

Agelasta ocellifera is a species of beetle in the family Cerambycidae. It was described by John O. Westwood in 1863, originally under the genus Lamia. It is known from the Philippines.
