= Agelasta villosipes =

Scientific classification
- Kingdom: Animalia
- Phylum: Arthropoda
- Clade: Pancrustacea
- Class: Insecta
- Order: Coleoptera
- Suborder: Polyphaga
- Infraorder: Cucujiformia
- Family: Cerambycidae
- Genus: Agelasta
- Species: A. villosipes

Binomial name
- Agelasta villosipes Breuning, 1939

Species of beetle

Agelasta villosipes is a species of beetle in the family Cerambycidae. It was described by Stephan von Breuning in 1939. It is known from Java.
