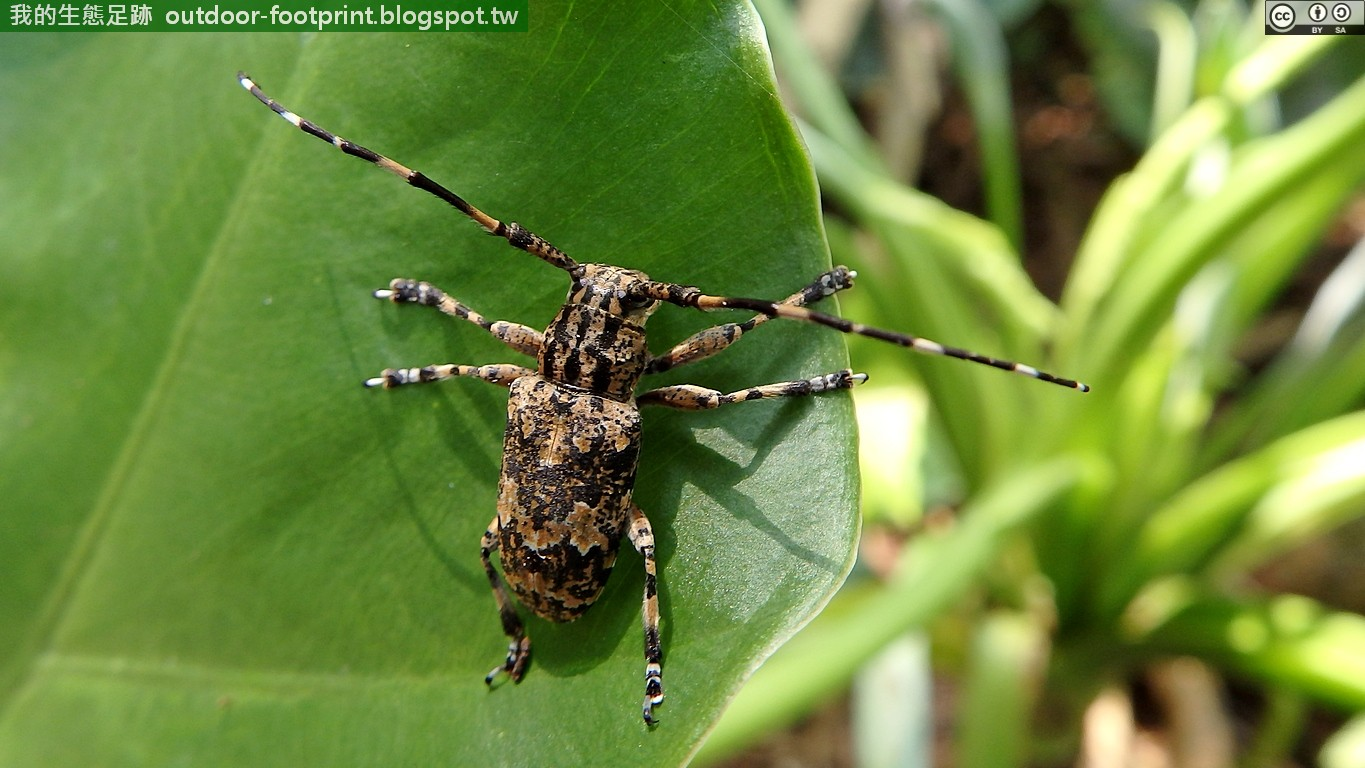

Scientific classification
- Domain: Eukaryota
- Kingdom: Animalia
- Phylum: Arthropoda
- Class: Insecta
- Order: Coleoptera
- Suborder: Polyphaga
- Infraorder: Cucujiformia
- Family: Cerambycidae
- Genus: Agelasta
- Species: A. perplexa

Binomial name
- Agelasta perplexa (Pascoe, 1858)

Synonyms
- Coptops japonica Breuning, 1936 nec Bates, 1873; Mesosa perplexa Pascoe, 1858; Mimocoptops formosana Pic, 1925 nec Schwarzer, 1925; Pachyosa perplexa (Pascoe) Matsushita, 1933; Saimia alternans Schwarzer, 1925

= Agelasta perplexa =

Species of beetle

Agelasta perplexa is a species of beetle in the family Cerambycidae. It was described by Francis Polkinghorne Pascoe in 1858. It is known from China, Taiwan and Japan.
