= Agelasta marionae =

Scientific classification
- Domain: Eukaryota
- Kingdom: Animalia
- Phylum: Arthropoda
- Class: Insecta
- Order: Coleoptera
- Suborder: Polyphaga
- Infraorder: Cucujiformia
- Family: Cerambycidae
- Genus: Agelasta
- Species: A. marionae

Binomial name
- Agelasta marionae Hüdepohl, 1985

Species of beetle

Agelasta marionae is a species of beetle in the family Cerambycidae. It was described by Karl-Ernst Hüdepohl in 1985. It is known from the Philippines.
