= Agelasta elongata =

Scientific classification
- Kingdom: Animalia
- Phylum: Arthropoda
- Class: Insecta
- Order: Coleoptera
- Suborder: Polyphaga
- Infraorder: Cucujiformia
- Family: Cerambycidae
- Genus: Agelasta
- Species: A. elongata

Binomial name
- Agelasta elongata Breuning, 1963

Species of beetle

Agelasta elongata is a species of beetle in the family Cerambycidae. It was described by Stephan von Breuning in 1963. It is known from Laos.
