= Agelasta praelongipes =

Scientific classification
- Domain: Eukaryota
- Kingdom: Animalia
- Phylum: Arthropoda
- Class: Insecta
- Order: Coleoptera
- Suborder: Polyphaga
- Infraorder: Cucujiformia
- Family: Cerambycidae
- Genus: Agelasta
- Species: A. praelongipes

Binomial name
- Agelasta praelongipes (Kusama & Irie, 1976)

Synonyms
- Mesosa praelongipes Kusama & Irie, 1976

Species of beetle

Agelasta praelongipes is a species of beetle in the family Cerambycidae. It was described by Kusama and Irie in 1976.
