= Agelasta glabrofasciata =

Scientific classification
- Kingdom: Animalia
- Phylum: Arthropoda
- Class: Insecta
- Order: Coleoptera
- Suborder: Polyphaga
- Infraorder: Cucujiformia
- Family: Cerambycidae
- Genus: Agelasta
- Species: A. glabrofasciata

Binomial name
- Agelasta glabrofasciata (Pic, 1917)

Synonyms
- Mesosa glabrofasciata Pic, 1917

Species of beetle

Agelasta glabrofasciata is a species of beetle in the family Cerambycidae. It was described by Maurice Pic in 1917. It is known from China.
