= Agelasta griseonotata =

Scientific classification
- Kingdom: Animalia
- Phylum: Arthropoda
- Class: Insecta
- Order: Coleoptera
- Suborder: Polyphaga
- Infraorder: Cucujiformia
- Family: Cerambycidae
- Genus: Agelasta
- Species: A. griseonotata

Binomial name
- Agelasta griseonotata Pic, 1944

Species of beetle

Agelasta griseonotata is a species of beetle in the family Cerambycidae. It was described by Maurice Pic in 1944. It is known from Vietnam.
