= Agelasta basispreta =

Scientific classification
- Domain: Eukaryota
- Kingdom: Animalia
- Phylum: Arthropoda
- Class: Insecta
- Order: Coleoptera
- Suborder: Polyphaga
- Infraorder: Cucujiformia
- Family: Cerambycidae
- Genus: Agelasta
- Species: A. basispreta

Binomial name
- Agelasta basispreta Heller, 1923

Synonyms
- Agelasta bizonata Aurivillius, 1923

Species of beetle

Agelasta basispreta is a species of beetle in the family Cerambycidae. It was described by Edmund Heller in 1923. It is known from the Philippines.
