= Agelasta alboplagiata =

Scientific classification
- Kingdom: Animalia
- Phylum: Arthropoda
- Class: Insecta
- Order: Coleoptera
- Suborder: Polyphaga
- Infraorder: Cucujiformia
- Family: Cerambycidae
- Genus: Agelasta
- Species: A. alboplagiata

Binomial name
- Agelasta alboplagiata (Breuning, 1935)

Synonyms
- Parasaimia alboplagiata Breuning, 1935

Species of beetle

Agelasta alboplagiata is a species of beetle in the family Cerambycidae. It was described by Stephan von Breuning in 1935. It is known from India.
