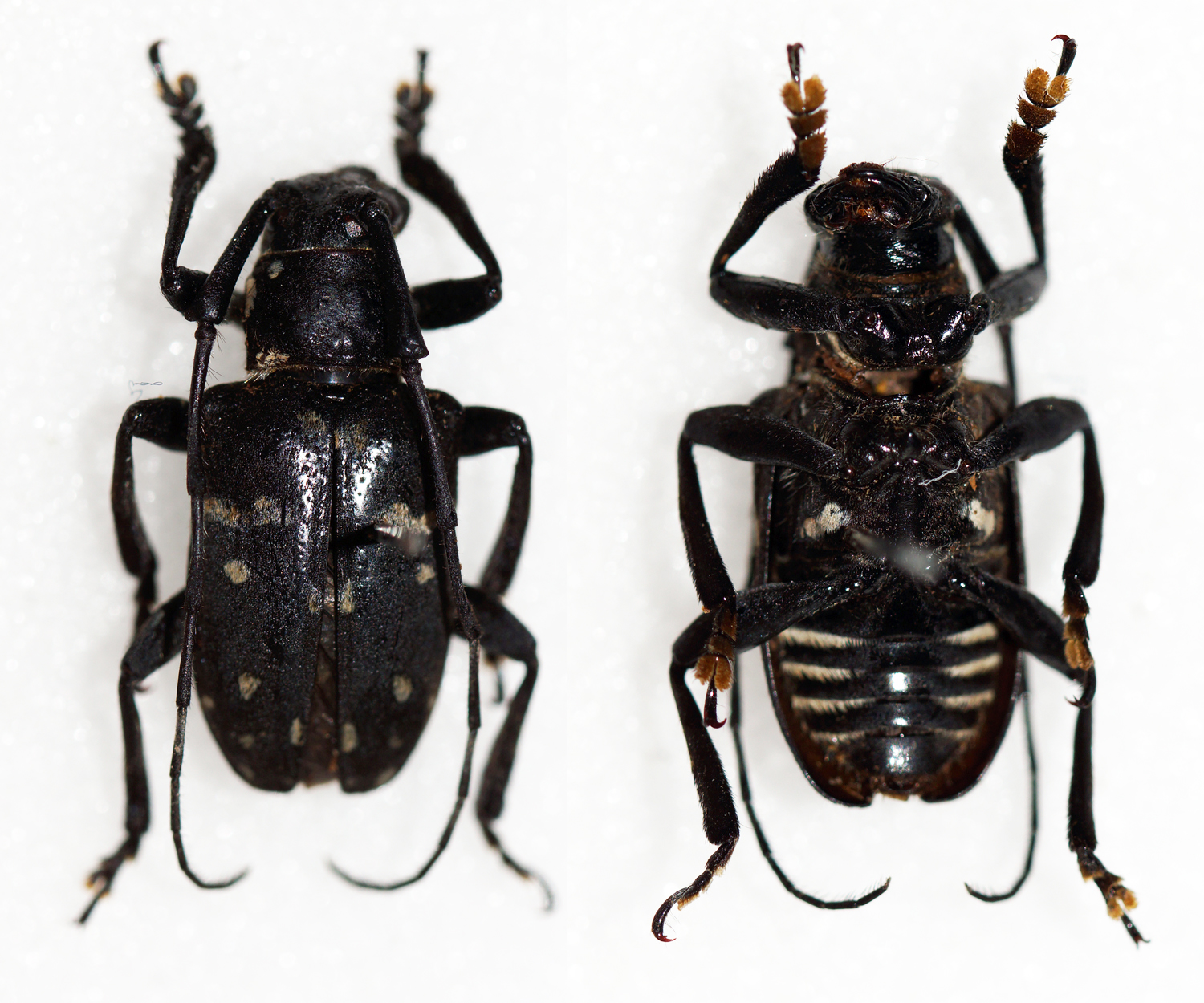

Conservation status
- Vulnerable (IUCN 3.1)

Scientific classification
- Kingdom: Animalia
- Phylum: Arthropoda
- Class: Insecta
- Order: Coleoptera
- Suborder: Polyphaga
- Infraorder: Cucujiformia
- Family: Cerambycidae
- Genus: Agelasta
- Species: A. mindanaonis

Binomial name
- Agelasta mindanaonis Breuning, 1939

Synonyms
- Agelasta albesignata Breuning, 1980; Agelasta breuningi Hüdepohl, 1983; Agelasta lumawigi Breuning, 1980; Agelasta mindanaonis m. albescens Breuning, 1980; Agelasta mindanaonis m. nigerrima Breuning, 1980; Agelasta pardalina Breuning, 1980 nec Heller, 1924; Agelasta roseomaculata Breuning, 1980 nec Breuning, 1947; Agelasta albosignata Breuning, 1980 (misspelling)

= Agelasta mindanaonis =

Species of beetle

Agelasta mindanaonis is a species of beetle in the family Cerambycidae. It was described by Stephan von Breuning in 1939. It is known from the Philippines.
