= Agelasta kumei =

Scientific classification
- Domain: Eukaryota
- Kingdom: Animalia
- Phylum: Arthropoda
- Class: Insecta
- Order: Coleoptera
- Suborder: Polyphaga
- Infraorder: Cucujiformia
- Family: Cerambycidae
- Genus: Agelasta
- Species: A. kumei

Binomial name
- Agelasta kumei (Takakuwa, 1991)

Synonyms
- Mesosa kumei Takakuwa, 1991

Species of beetle

Agelasta kumei is a species of beetle in the family Cerambycidae. It was described by Takakuwa in 1991.
