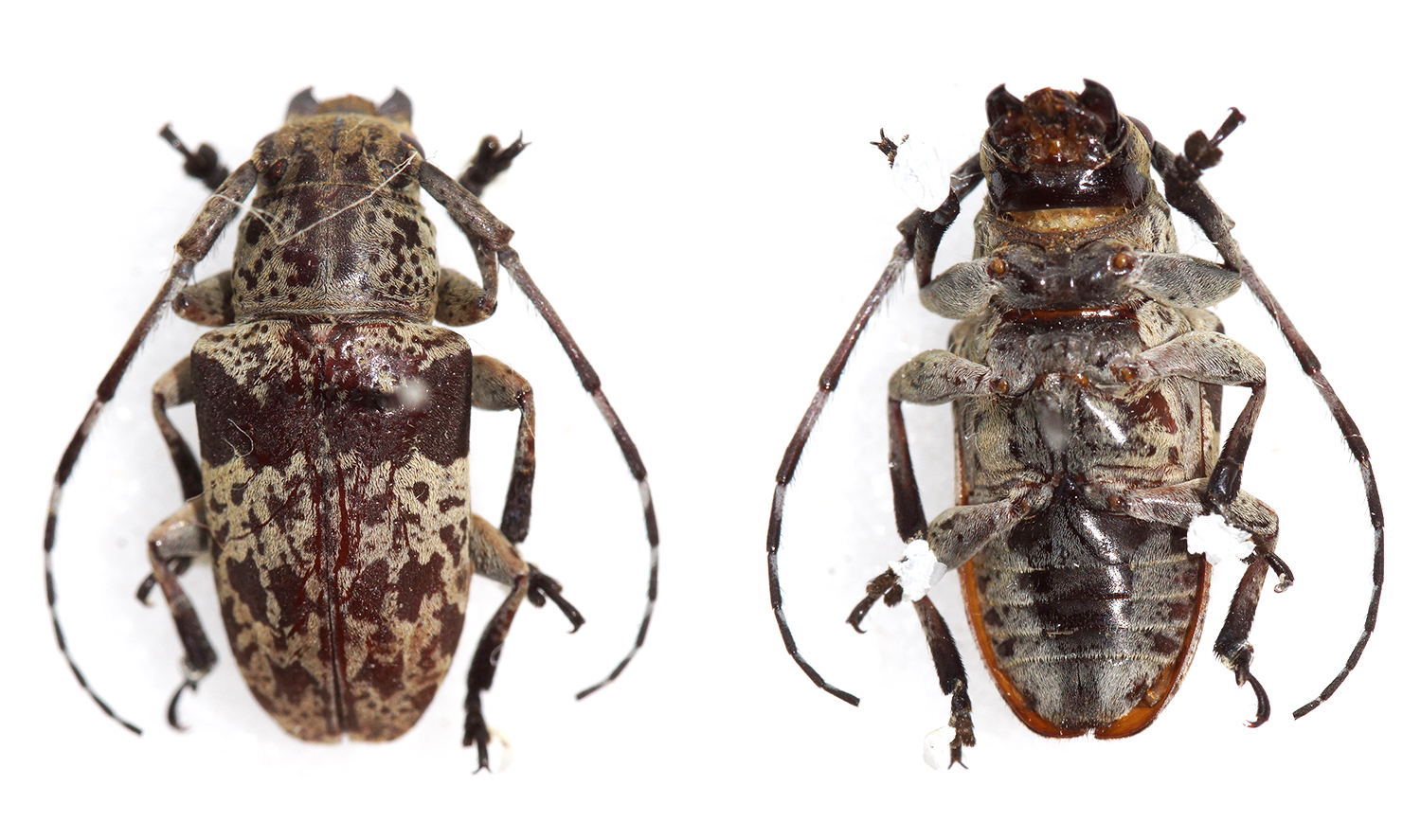
- top and bottom view

Scientific classification
- Kingdom: Animalia
- Phylum: Arthropoda
- Class: Insecta
- Order: Coleoptera
- Suborder: Polyphaga
- Infraorder: Cucujiformia
- Family: Cerambycidae
- Genus: Agelasta
- Species: A. tonkinea

Binomial name
- Agelasta tonkinea Pic, 1925

Synonyms
- Agelasta formosana Schwarzer, 1925

= Agelasta tonkinea =

Species of beetle

Agelasta tonkinea is a species of beetle in the family Cerambycidae. It was described by Maurice Pic in 1925.

== Subspecies ==
- Agelasta tonkinea omeishana Gressitt, 1951
- Agelasta tonkinea palminsulana (Gressitt, 1940)
- Agelasta tonkinea tonkinea Pic, 1925
