= Agelasta quadrimaculata =

Scientific classification
- Domain: Eukaryota
- Kingdom: Animalia
- Phylum: Arthropoda
- Class: Insecta
- Order: Coleoptera
- Suborder: Polyphaga
- Infraorder: Cucujiformia
- Family: Cerambycidae
- Genus: Agelasta
- Species: A. quadrimaculata

Binomial name
- Agelasta quadrimaculata (Gahan, 1890)

Synonyms
- Coptops quadrimaculatus Gahan, 1890

Species of beetle

Agelasta quadrimaculata is a species of beetle in the family Cerambycidae. It was described by Charles Joseph Gahan in 1890. It is known from India.
