= Agelasta konoi =

Scientific classification
- Kingdom: Animalia
- Phylum: Arthropoda
- Class: Insecta
- Order: Coleoptera
- Suborder: Polyphaga
- Infraorder: Cucujiformia
- Family: Cerambycidae
- Genus: Agelasta
- Species: A. konoi

Binomial name
- Agelasta konoi (Hayashi, 1956)

Synonyms
- Mesosa konoi Hayashi, 1956

Species of beetle

Agelasta konoi is a species of beetle in the family Cerambycidae. It was described by Masao Hayashi in 1956.

== Subspecies ==
- Agelasta konoi amamiana (Hayashi, 1962)
- Agelasta konoi konoi (Hayashi, 1962)
- Agelasta konoi kumejimana (Kusama & Takakuwa, 1984)
- Agelasta konoi okinawana (Hayashi, 1960)
- Agelasta konoi okinoerabuensis (Ohbayashi, 1959)
