= Agelasta rufa =

Scientific classification
- Kingdom: Animalia
- Phylum: Arthropoda
- Class: Insecta
- Order: Coleoptera
- Suborder: Polyphaga
- Infraorder: Cucujiformia
- Family: Cerambycidae
- Genus: Agelasta
- Species: A. rufa

Binomial name
- Agelasta rufa (Breuning, 1935)

Synonyms
- Mesosa rufa (Breuning) Ohbayashi, 1963; Mutatocoptops rufa (Breuning) Breuning, 1939; Pseudaemocia rufa Breuning, 1935

Species of beetle

Agelasta rufa is a species of beetle in the family Cerambycidae. It was described by Stephan von Breuning in 1935, originally under the genus Pseudaemocia. It is known from Japan.
