= Agelasta newmanni =

Scientific classification
- Kingdom: Animalia
- Phylum: Arthropoda
- Class: Insecta
- Order: Coleoptera
- Suborder: Polyphaga
- Infraorder: Cucujiformia
- Family: Cerambycidae
- Genus: Agelasta
- Species: A. newmanni

Binomial name
- Agelasta newmanni White, 1856

Synonyms
- Agelasta newmani (White) Breuning (unjustified emendation); Choeromorpha newmani (White) Aurivillius, 1922 (unjustified emendation)

Species of beetle

Agelasta newmanni is a species of beetle in the family Cerambycidae. It was described by White in 1856. It is known from Borneo and Malaysia.
