= Acalolepta annamensis =

Scientific classification
- Kingdom: Animalia
- Phylum: Arthropoda
- Class: Insecta
- Order: Coleoptera
- Suborder: Polyphaga
- Infraorder: Cucujiformia
- Family: Cerambycidae
- Genus: Acalolepta
- Species: A. annamensis

Binomial name
- Acalolepta annamensis (Breuning, 1958)

Synonyms
- Cypriola annamensis Breuning, 1958

Species of beetle

Acalolepta annamensis is a species of beetle in the family Cerambycidae. It was described by Stephan von Breuning in 1958. It is known from Vietnam.
