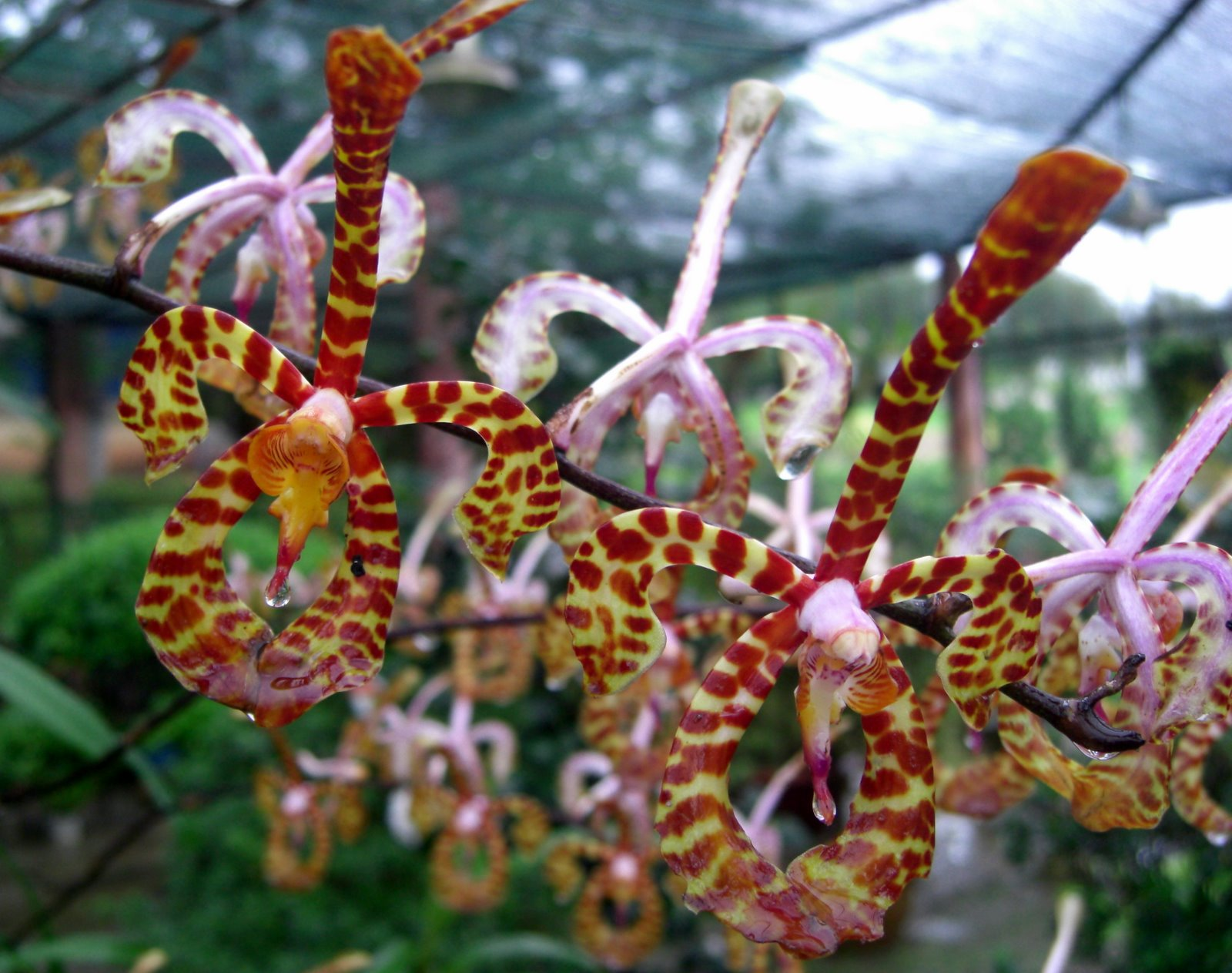
- Arachnis annamensis

Scientific classification
- Kingdom: Plantae
- Clade: Tracheophytes
- Clade: Angiosperms
- Clade: Monocots
- Order: Asparagales
- Family: Orchidaceae
- Subfamily: Epidendroideae
- Genus: Arachnis
- Species: A. annamensis

Binomial name
- Arachnis annamensis (Rolfe) J.J.Sm.

= Arachnis annamensis =

Species of orchid

Arachnis annamensis is a species of orchid, originated in Vietnam.

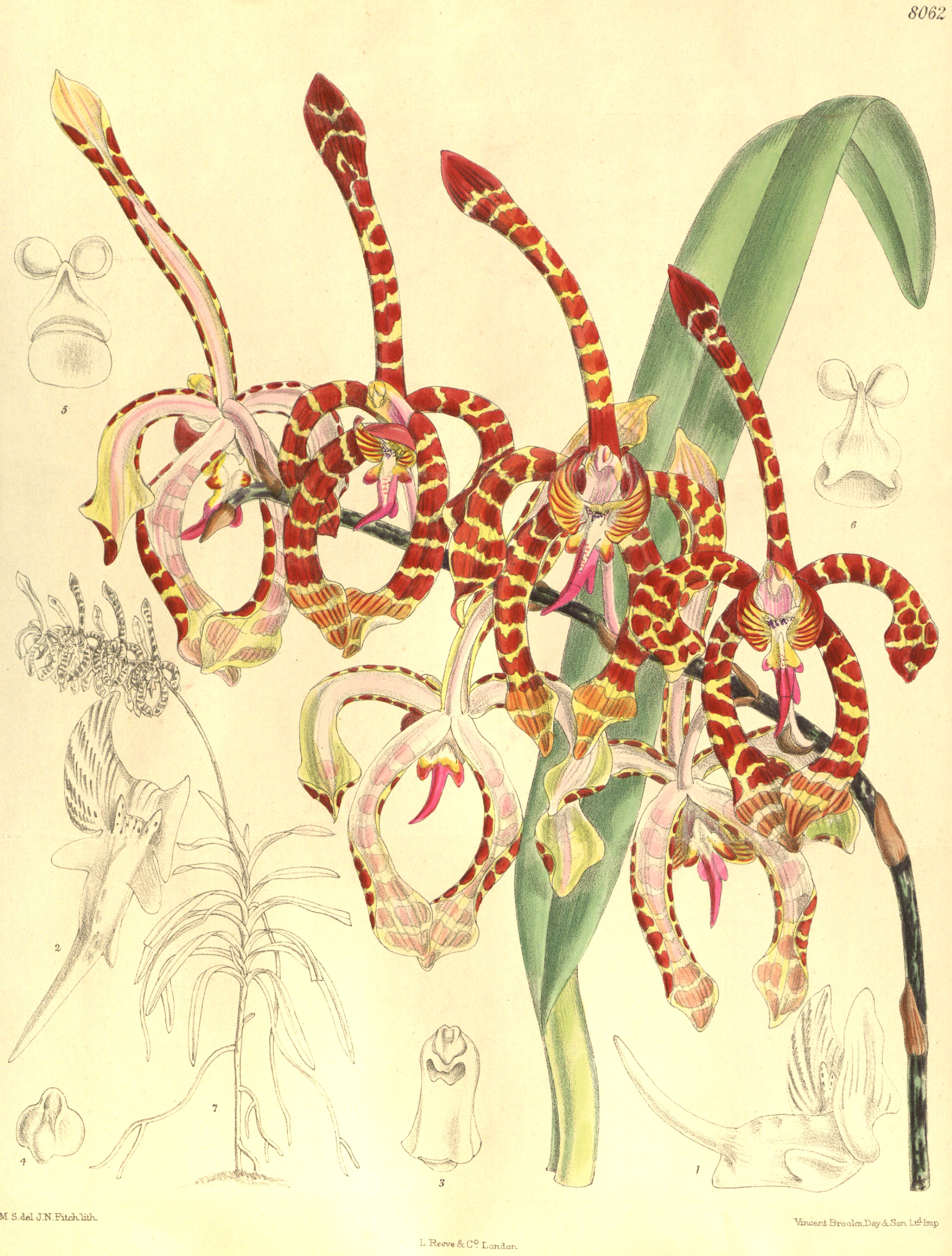
Ilustración

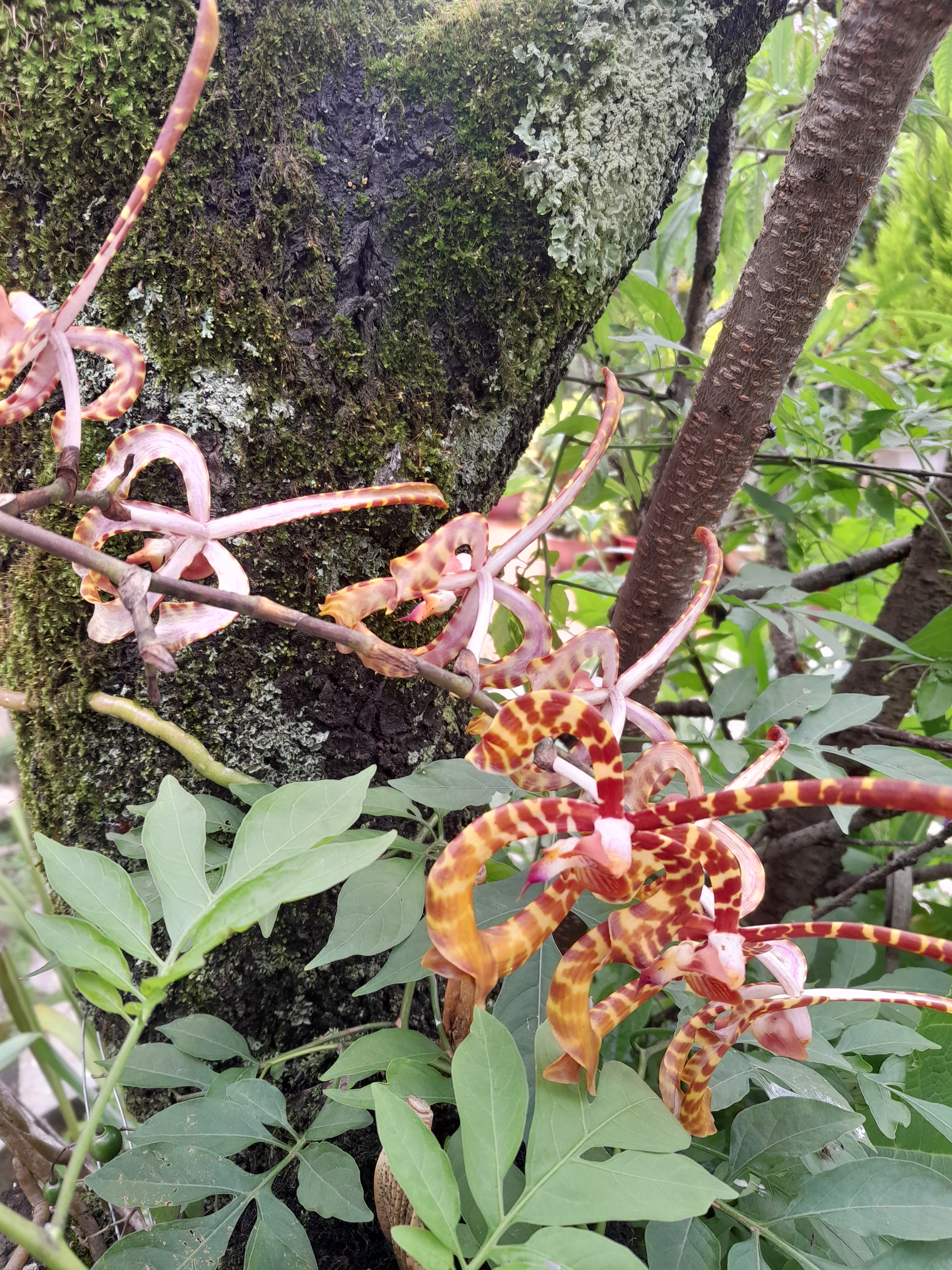
Arachnis annamensis

== Description ==
It is a sizable monopodial orchid that thrives in warm climates, exhibiting epiphytic growth. The elongated stem carries numerous alternate leaves, slightly bilobed at the apex. It produces an upright inflorescence around 60 cm long in spring, with numerous flowers in the axils.

== Distribution and habitat ==
It is found in Vietnam in evergreen, semi-deciduous forests, and low dry deciduous forests at elevations from sea level to 1500 meters.

== Taxonomy ==
Arachnis annamensis was described by (Rolfe) J.J.Sm. and published in Dutch-Indian Journal of Natural History 72: 73. 1912.

Etymology

Arachnis: generic name derived from the Latinization of the word Greek: αράχνη (arachnis) meaning "spider", about the shape of its flowers.

annamensis: Geographical epithet referring to its location in Annam in Vietnam.

Synonyms

- Arachnanthe annamensis Rolfebasonym
- Arachnis evrardi (Guillaumin) Tang & F.T.Wang
- Renanthera evrardii Guillaumin
