= Agelasta annamensis =

Scientific classification
- Kingdom: Animalia
- Phylum: Arthropoda
- Class: Insecta
- Order: Coleoptera
- Suborder: Polyphaga
- Infraorder: Cucujiformia
- Family: Cerambycidae
- Genus: Agelasta
- Species: A. annamensis

Binomial name
- Agelasta annamensis (Breuning, 1938)

Synonyms
- Dissosira annamensis Breuning, 1938

Species of beetle

Agelasta annamensis is a species of beetle in the family Cerambycidae. It was described by Stephan von Breuning in 1938. It is known from Vietnam.
