= Abacetus annamensis =

Scientific classification
- Domain: Eukaryota
- Kingdom: Animalia
- Phylum: Arthropoda
- Class: Insecta
- Order: Coleoptera
- Suborder: Adephaga
- Family: Carabidae
- Genus: Abacetus
- Species: A. annamensis

Binomial name
- Abacetus annamensis Tschitscherine, 1903

Species of beetle

Abacetus annamensis is a species of ground beetle in the subfamily Pterostichinae. It was described by Tikhon Chicherin in 1903 and is an endemic species found in Vietnam, Southeast Asia.
