= A. dorsalis =

A. dorsalis may refer to:

- Abacetus dorsalis, a ground beetle
- Acanthotritus dorsalis, a longhorn beetle
- Aelurosaurus dorsalis or Aeluroscalabotes dorsalis, synonyms of Aeluroscalabotes felinus, the cat gecko, a lizard found in Asia
- Afrixalus dorsalis, the brown banana frog, found in Africa
- Alabes dorsalis, the common shore eel, found in Australia
- Ameiva dorsalis, a synonym of Pholidoscelis dorsalis, the Jamaican ameiva
- Anabazenops dorsalis, the bamboo foliage-gleaner, a bird found in South America
  - Automolus dorsalis, a synonym of Anabazenops dorsalis
- Anacampsis dorsalis, a synonym of Battaristis emissurella, a moth found in South America
- Anaches dorsalis, a longhorn beetle found in Asia
- Anchomenus dorsalis, a ground beetle found in Europe, North Africa, the Middle East, and Central Asia
- Aricia dorsalis, a synonym of Phaonia pallida, the muscid fly, found in the Palearctic
- Aulacophora dorsalis, a leaf beetle found in Southeast Asia
