= A. aeneolus =

A. aeneolus may refer to:

- Abacetus aeneolus, a Namibian ground beetle
- Anchomenus aeneolus, a North American ground beetle
- Anthonomus aeneolus, a North American weevil
