= Battaristis unistrigella =

Scientific classification
- Domain: Eukaryota
- Kingdom: Animalia
- Phylum: Arthropoda
- Class: Insecta
- Order: Lepidoptera
- Family: Gelechiidae
- Genus: Battaristis
- Species: B. unistrigella

Binomial name
- Battaristis unistrigella (Busck, 1914)

Synonyms
- Anacampsis unistrigella Busck, 1914

Species of moth

Battaristis unistrigella is a moth of the family Gelechiidae. It was described by August Busck in 1914. It is found in Panama.

The wingspan is about 8 mm. Adults are similar to Battaristis bistrigella, but somewhat darker and more greenish in colour. The costal spots are nearly contiguous, the first one smaller than in B. bistrigella and the second and third separated only by a thin, white streak. There is only one white streaklet on the costal margin beyond the fascia and the longitudinal, black streak at the angle of the fascia is surrounded by white scales contiguous with the fascia. There are two, elongate, black streaks at the end of the cell and the cell and dorsal part are not mottled.
