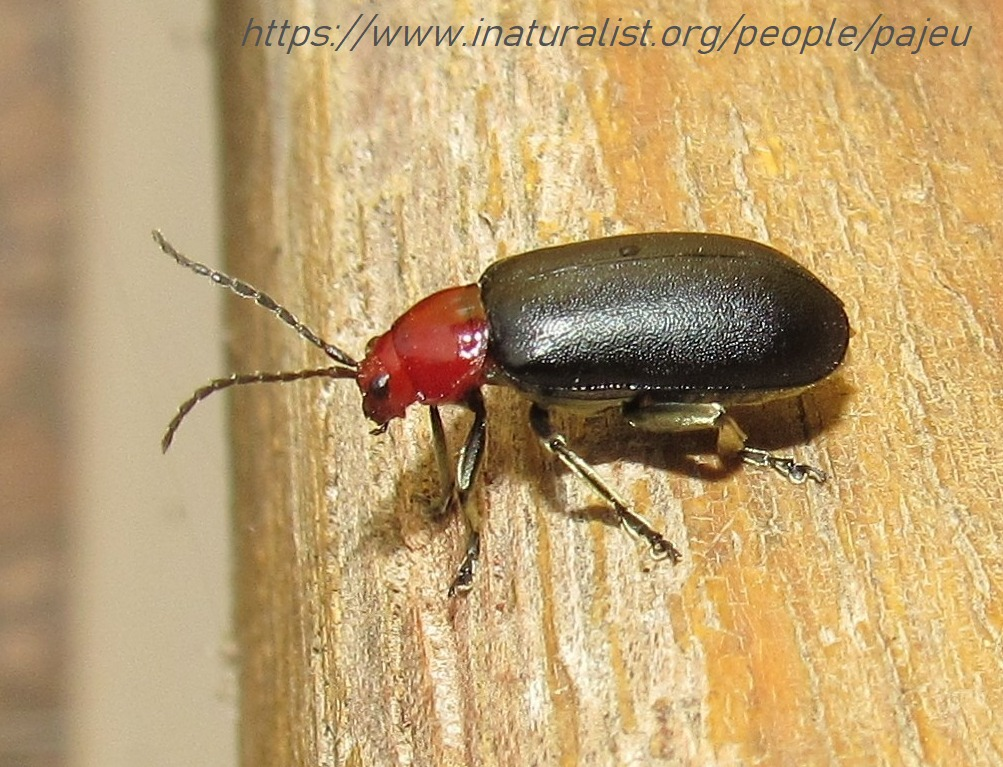

Scientific classification
- Kingdom: Animalia
- Phylum: Arthropoda
- Class: Insecta
- Order: Coleoptera
- Suborder: Polyphaga
- Infraorder: Cucujiformia
- Family: Chrysomelidae
- Subfamily: Galerucinae
- Tribe: Alticini
- Genus: Cacoscelis
- Species: C. nigripennis

Binomial name
- Cacoscelis nigripennis Clark, 1865

= Cacoscelis nigripennis =

Species of flea beetle

Cacoscelis nigripennis is a species of flea beetle in the family Chrysomelidae.

== Description ==
Adults have a black body, bright red head and thorax. They are usually 10 mm long and range between 5 mm and 4 mm wide.

== Host plants ==
They are well known for feeding on Passiflora caerulea, being one of the main problems for the plant when they are in large groups.

== Distribution ==
Cacoscelis nigripennis are native to South America.

== See also ==
- Aulacophora nigripennis, a species of leaf beetle in the genus Aulacophora
