= Anaches wenhsini =

Scientific classification
- Kingdom: Animalia
- Phylum: Arthropoda
- Class: Insecta
- Order: Coleoptera
- Suborder: Polyphaga
- Infraorder: Cucujiformia
- Family: Cerambycidae
- Genus: Anaches
- Species: A. wenhsini

Binomial name
- Anaches wenhsini Holzschuh & Lin, 2013

Species of beetle

Anaches wenhsini is a species of beetle in the family Cerambycidae. It was described in 2013. It is endemic to Taiwan.

Anaches wenhsini measure 11.6–14.8 mm (0.46–0.58 in).
