= Battaristis prismatopa =

Scientific classification
- Domain: Eukaryota
- Kingdom: Animalia
- Phylum: Arthropoda
- Class: Insecta
- Order: Lepidoptera
- Family: Gelechiidae
- Genus: Battaristis
- Species: B. prismatopa

Binomial name
- Battaristis prismatopa Meyrick, 1914

Species of moth

Battaristis prismatopa is a moth of the family Gelechiidae. It was described by Edward Meyrick in 1914. It is found in Guyana.

The wingspan is about 10 mm. The forewings are whitish ochreous, with a few scattered dark fuscous scales posteriorly. The plical and second discal stigmata are dark fuscous and there is a blackish-fuscous streak along the costa from before the middle to near the apex, cut by a very oblique white strigula beyond the middle. A fine white subterminal line is found from three-fourths of the costa to the tornus, rather acutely angulated in the middle, the upper half faintly curved outwards, followed by brownish suffusion, the lower straight. There is also a small black rhomboidal spot on the termen beneath the apex, edged with some whitish suffusion. The hindwings are dark grey.
