= Battaristis stereogramma =

Scientific classification
- Domain: Eukaryota
- Kingdom: Animalia
- Phylum: Arthropoda
- Class: Insecta
- Order: Lepidoptera
- Family: Gelechiidae
- Genus: Battaristis
- Species: B. stereogramma

Binomial name
- Battaristis stereogramma Meyrick, 1914

Species of moth

Battaristis stereogramma is a moth of the family Gelechiidae. It was described by Edward Meyrick in 1914. It is found in Guyana.

The wingspan is 10–11 mm. The forewings are leaden grey, sometimes irrorated (sprinkled) with white and with a blackish spot or very oblique mark on the fold about one-fourth. There is a blackish dot in the middle of the disc and an oblique whitish strigula from the costa before the middle, edged on both sides with black, the posterior edging confluent with a dark fuscous fascia preceding the subterminal line, suffused anteriorly and blackish on the costa. The subterminal line from three-fourths of the costa to the dorsum before the tornus is nearly straight and whitish and the terminal area beyond this is more or less whitish irrorated (sprinkled), especially towards the costa, with three or four more or less indistinct blackish pre-marginal dots. The hindwings are dark fuscous, somewhat thinly scaled in the disc anteriorly.
