= Aulacophora approximata =

Scientific classification
- Kingdom: Animalia
- Phylum: Arthropoda
- Clade: Pancrustacea
- Class: Insecta
- Order: Coleoptera
- Suborder: Polyphaga
- Infraorder: Cucujiformia
- Family: Chrysomelidae
- Genus: Aulacophora
- Species: A. approximate

Binomial name
- Aulacophora approximate Baly, 1886

Species of beetle

Aulacophora approximata is a species of leaf beetle in the genus Aulacophora that was discovered by Baly in 1886.
