= Battaristis concisa =

Scientific classification
- Kingdom: Animalia
- Phylum: Arthropoda
- Class: Insecta
- Order: Lepidoptera
- Family: Gelechiidae
- Genus: Battaristis
- Species: B. concisa

Binomial name
- Battaristis concisa Meyrick, 1929

Species of moth

Battaristis concisa is a moth of the family Gelechiidae. It was described by Edward Meyrick in 1929. It is found in Cuba.
