= Battaristis atelesta =

Scientific classification
- Domain: Eukaryota
- Kingdom: Animalia
- Phylum: Arthropoda
- Class: Insecta
- Order: Lepidoptera
- Family: Gelechiidae
- Genus: Battaristis
- Species: B. atelesta

Binomial name
- Battaristis atelesta Meyrick, 1914

Species of moth

Battaristis atelesta is a moth of the family Gelechiidae. It was described by Edward Meyrick in 1914. It is found in Guyana.

The wingspan is about 10 mm. The forewings are dark bronzy grey with a small blackish spot on the base of the dorsum and a blackish spot on the fold before one-fourth. The plical and second discal stigmata are black and there is a thick blackish streak along the costa from two-fifths to the apex, attenuated anteriorly, cut by a very oblique fine whitish strigula from beyond the middle, and by another somewhat less oblique from three-fourths, terminating in an undefined patch of whitish irroration (sprinkles) near the termen. The hindwings are dark fuscous.
