= Battaristis pasadenae =

Scientific classification
- Domain: Eukaryota
- Kingdom: Animalia
- Phylum: Arthropoda
- Class: Insecta
- Order: Lepidoptera
- Family: Gelechiidae
- Genus: Battaristis
- Species: B. pasadenae

Binomial name
- Battaristis pasadenae (Keifer, 1935)

Synonyms
- Duvita pasadenae Keifer, 1935

Species of moth

Battaristis pasadenae is a moth of the family Gelechiidae. It was described by Keifer in 1935. It is found in North America, where it has been recorded from California.

The wingspan is about 11–12 mm. The forewings are fuscous, the scales obscurely white-tipped and with the basal three-fourths nearly unicolorous but the stigmata more or less indicated by faint dark dots. The plical stigma is found at one-third and the first discal obliquely beyond the plical and a short white dash opposite on the costa. The second discal stigma is found at about two-thirds, with some white scaling. There is a sharply outwardly angulated narrow white fascia leaving the costa just beyond two-thirds, running to the tornus, the upper part longer and both parts concave. The wing beyond the fascia is somewhat more white irrorated than the basal part of the wing. The hindwings are light fuscous.
