= Battaristis melanamba =

Scientific classification
- Domain: Eukaryota
- Kingdom: Animalia
- Phylum: Arthropoda
- Class: Insecta
- Order: Lepidoptera
- Family: Gelechiidae
- Genus: Battaristis
- Species: B. melanamba

Binomial name
- Battaristis melanamba Meyrick, 1914

Species of moth

Battaristis melanamba is a moth of the family Gelechiidae. It was described by Edward Meyrick in 1914. It is found in Guyana.

The wingspan is about 9 mm. The forewings are leaden grey, finely sprinkled with whitish with black dots beneath the fold before one-fourth and before the middle. The costal edge is black from the base to a minute black strigula at one-fifth and there are two adjacent flattened-triangular black costal patches extending from about one-third to four-fifths, separated by an oblique whitish strigula. There are two or three indistinct minute black pre-marginal dots near the termen. The hindwings are dark fuscous.
