= Battaristis perinaeta =

Scientific classification
- Kingdom: Animalia
- Phylum: Arthropoda
- Class: Insecta
- Order: Lepidoptera
- Family: Gelechiidae
- Genus: Battaristis
- Species: B. perinaeta

Binomial name
- Battaristis perinaeta (Walsingham, 1910)

Synonyms
- Anacampsis perinaeta Walsingham, 1910

Species of moth

Battaristis perinaeta is a moth of the family Gelechiidae. It was described by Thomas de Grey, 6th Baron Walsingham, in 1910. It is found in Mexico (Guerrero).

The wingspan is about 9 mm. The forewings are stone-grey to half their length, then dark bronzy brown. There are several snow-white streaks on the outer half, one forming an oblique costal spot beyond the middle, a second small straight triangular spot before the commencement of the costal cilia, and a third above the tornus, divided by a dark line into two longitudinal streaks. In addition to these is an oblique apical streak, reduplicated in the apical cilia, a small length-streak below the outer end of the fold, and a shorter diverging streaklet above it. The hindwings are umber-brown.
