= Aulacophora almora =

Scientific classification
- Kingdom: Animalia
- Phylum: Arthropoda
- Clade: Pancrustacea
- Class: Insecta
- Order: Coleoptera
- Suborder: Polyphaga
- Infraorder: Cucujiformia
- Family: Chrysomelidae
- Genus: Aulacophora
- Species: A. almora

Binomial name
- Aulacophora almora Maulik, 1936

Species of beetle

Aulacophora almora is a species of leaf beetle in the genus Aulacophora.
