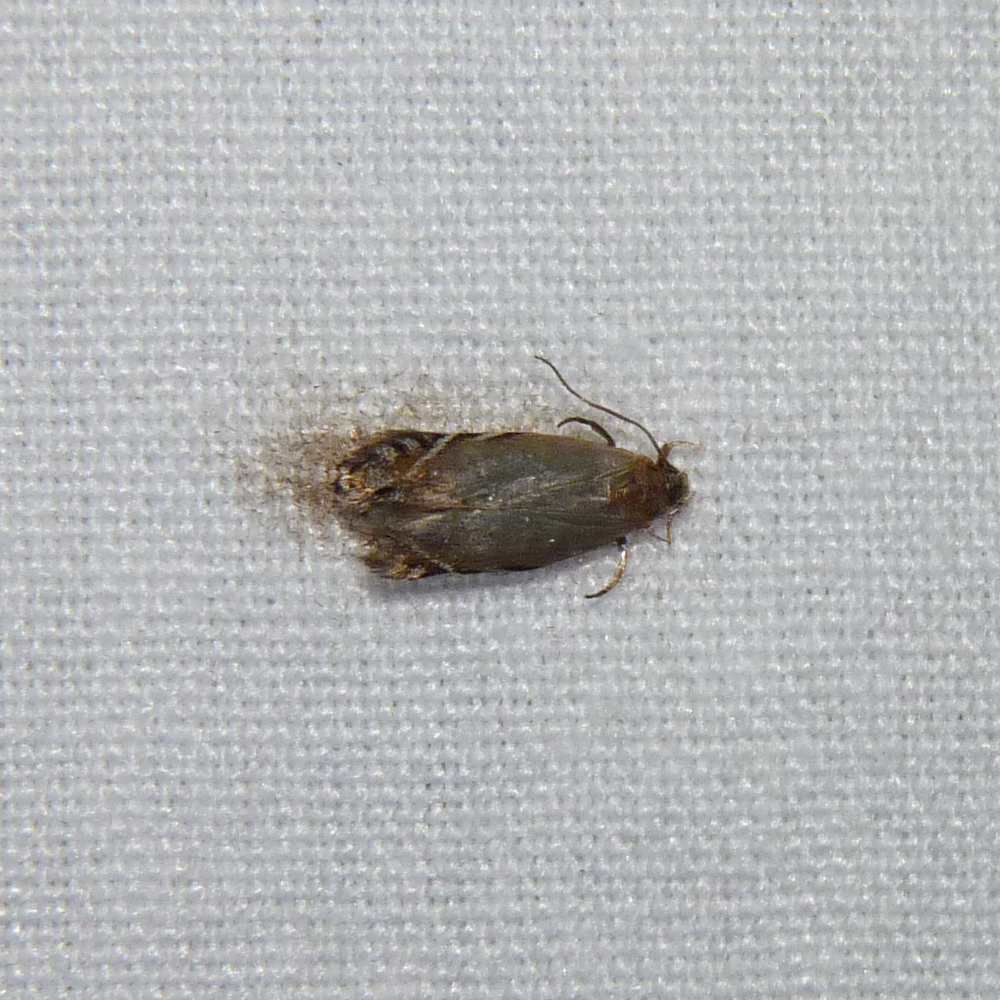

Scientific classification
- Kingdom: Animalia
- Phylum: Arthropoda
- Clade: Pancrustacea
- Class: Insecta
- Order: Lepidoptera
- Family: Gelechiidae
- Genus: Battaristis
- Species: B. concinusella

Binomial name
- Battaristis concinusella (Chambers, 1877)

Synonyms
- Gelechia concinusella Chambers, 1877

= Battaristis concinusella =

Species of moth

Battaristis concinusella is a species of moth in the family Gelechiidae. It is found in North America, including California, Delaware, Illinois, Maryland, Minnesota, North Dakota, Ohio, Ontario, Quebec, South Carolina and West Virginia.

Adults are ash grey with three or four minute brown spots on the disc. There are two narrow, very oblique, short, dark brown, costal streaks near each other, one just before and the other just behind the middle, followed immediately by a narrow white costal streak which passes obliquely back into the middle of the apical part of the wing where it meets and forms an acute angle with an opposite dorsal streak, and behind this acute angle the apex is hoary with an apical black spot or dash. At the base of the cilia there is a narrow dark brown hindmarginal line which is margined behind by a row of hoary scales. The costal and dorsal margins, at the base of the cilia, are suffused with pale ochreous.
