= Anchomenus virescens =

Scientific classification
- Domain: Eukaryota
- Kingdom: Animalia
- Phylum: Arthropoda
- Class: Insecta
- Order: Coleoptera
- Suborder: Adephaga
- Family: Carabidae
- Genus: Anchomenus
- Species: A. virescens

Binomial name
- Anchomenus virescens (Motschulsky, 1865)

Synonyms
- Atranus virescens Motschulsky, 1865

Species of beetle

Anchomenus virescens is a species of ground beetle in the subfamily Platyninae. It is found in Ukraine, the southern part of Russia, and the East Palaearctic.
