= Aulacophora andamanica =

Scientific classification
- Kingdom: Animalia
- Phylum: Arthropoda
- Clade: Pancrustacea
- Class: Insecta
- Order: Coleoptera
- Suborder: Polyphaga
- Infraorder: Cucujiformia
- Family: Chrysomelidae
- Genus: Aulacophora
- Species: A. andamanica

Binomial name
- Aulacophora andamanica Duvivier, 1885

Species of beetle

Aulacophora andamanica is a species of leaf beetle in the genus Aulacophora.
