= Anaches cylindricus =

Scientific classification
- Kingdom: Animalia
- Phylum: Arthropoda
- Class: Insecta
- Order: Coleoptera
- Suborder: Polyphaga
- Infraorder: Cucujiformia
- Family: Cerambycidae
- Genus: Anaches
- Species: A. cylindricus

Binomial name
- Anaches cylindricus (Gressitt, 1939)

Synonyms
- Sthenias cylindricus Gressitt, 1939

Species of beetle

Anaches cylindricus is a species of beetle in the family Cerambycidae. It was described by Judson Linsley Gressitt in 1939. It is endemic to southeastern China (Zhejiang, Hunan, and Fujian).

Anaches cylindricus measure 11–14 mm (0.43–0.55 in).
