= Battaristis acroglypta =

Scientific classification
- Domain: Eukaryota
- Kingdom: Animalia
- Phylum: Arthropoda
- Class: Insecta
- Order: Lepidoptera
- Family: Gelechiidae
- Genus: Battaristis
- Species: B. acroglypta

Binomial name
- Battaristis acroglypta Meyrick, 1929

Species of moth

Battaristis acroglypta is a moth of the family Gelechiidae. It was described by Edward Meyrick in 1929. It is found in Colombia.
