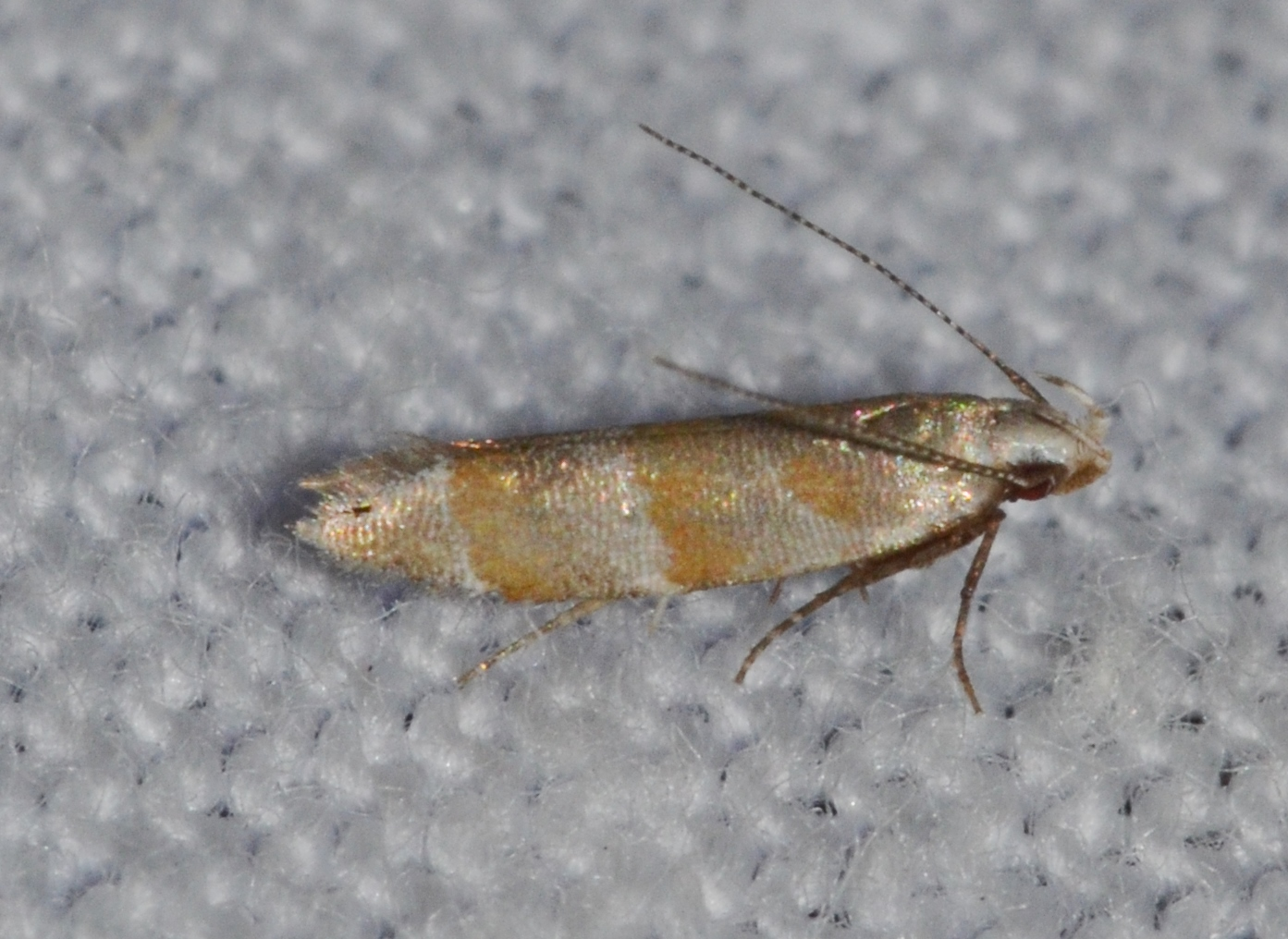

Scientific classification
- Domain: Eukaryota
- Kingdom: Animalia
- Phylum: Arthropoda
- Class: Insecta
- Order: Lepidoptera
- Family: Gelechiidae
- Genus: Battaristis
- Species: B. vittella

Binomial name
- Battaristis vittella (Busck, 1916)

Synonyms
- Duvita vittella Busck, 1916

= Battaristis vittella =

Species of moth

Battaristis vittella, the stripe-backed moth, is a species of moth in the family Gelechiidae. It is found in North America, where it has been recorded from the eastern United States and southern Canada.

The wingspan is 8–10 mm.
