= Battaristis coniosema =

Scientific classification
- Domain: Eukaryota
- Kingdom: Animalia
- Phylum: Arthropoda
- Class: Insecta
- Order: Lepidoptera
- Family: Gelechiidae
- Genus: Battaristis
- Species: B. coniosema

Binomial name
- Battaristis coniosema Meyrick, 1922

Species of moth

Battaristis coniosema is a moth of the family Gelechiidae. It was described by Edward Meyrick in 1922. It is found in Peru and Pará, Brazil.

The wingspan is 9–10 mm. The forewings are grey with the costal area broadly suffused with white on the anterior half and a thick black upcurved streak from towards the dorsum at one-third to the disc at three-fifths, the posterior half edged above by a suffused white streak extended nearly to the angle of the subterminal line, and marked above by a black dot representing the second discal stigma. There is a bronzy-blackish streak along the costa from two-fifths to the apex, anteriorly acute, cut by very oblique fine white lines at middle and two-thirds, the latter (subterminal line) continued to the termen where it forms a very acute angular projection including a black strigula, and then towards the dorsum before the tornus but not reaching it. The area between the costal and discal streaks suffused whitish and tinged brown. A dark grey white-speckled sub-oblique streak runs from the costa at five-sixths to the projection of the subterminal line. The hindwings are dark fuscous.
