= Anaches yitingi =

Scientific classification
- Kingdom: Animalia
- Phylum: Arthropoda
- Class: Insecta
- Order: Coleoptera
- Suborder: Polyphaga
- Infraorder: Cucujiformia
- Family: Cerambycidae
- Genus: Anaches
- Species: A. yitingi

Binomial name
- Anaches yitingi Holzschuh & Lin, 2013

Species of beetle

Anaches yitingi is a species of beetle in the family Cerambycidae. It was described in 2013. It is endemic to Taiwan.

Anaches yitingi measure 10–13.1 mm (0.39–0.52 in).
