= Anaches =

Scientific classification
- Domain: Eukaryota
- Kingdom: Animalia
- Phylum: Arthropoda
- Class: Insecta
- Order: Coleoptera
- Suborder: Polyphaga
- Infraorder: Cucujiformia
- Family: Cerambycidae
- Subfamily: Lamiinae
- Tribe: Pteropliini
- Genus: Anaches; Pascoe, 1865

Type species
- Sthenias dorsalis Pascoe, 1858

Species
- 7 species (see text)

Genus of beetles

Anaches is a genus of longhorn beetles of the subfamily Lamiinae. The genus is distributed in South, Southeast, and East Asia, from India and Nepal eastward to China and Taiwan.

== Species ==
There are seven recognized species:

- Anaches albaninus (Gressitt, 1942)
- Anaches cylindricus (Gressitt, 1939)
- Anaches dorsalis (Pascoe, 1858)
- Anaches m-signatus Lin & Weigel, 2022
- Anaches medioalbus (Breuning, 1956)
- Anaches wenhsini Holzschuh & Lin, 2013
- Anaches yitingi Holzschuh & Lin, 2013
