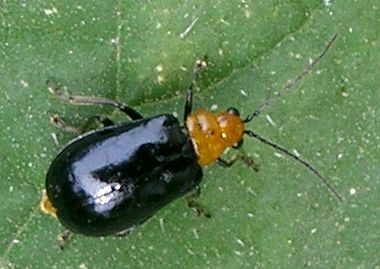
- Aulacophora nigripennis

Scientific classification
- Kingdom: Animalia
- Phylum: Arthropoda
- Class: Insecta
- Order: Coleoptera
- Suborder: Polyphaga
- Infraorder: Cucujiformia
- Family: Chrysomelidae
- Subfamily: Galerucinae
- Tribe: Luperini
- Subtribe: Aulacophorina
- Genus: Aulacophora; Chevrolat in Dejean, 1836

Type species
- Galleruca quadraria (= Galleruca analis Weber, 1801) Olivier, 1808

Synonyms
- Raphidopalpa Chevrolat in Dejean, 1836; Acutipalpa Rosenhauer, 1856; Rhaphidopalpa Rosenhauer, 1856; Ceratia Chapuis, 1876; Triaplatys Fairmaire, 1877; Cerania Weise, 1892; Orthaulaca Weise, 1892; Pachypalpa Weise, 1892; Sphaerarthra Weise, 1892

= Aulacophora =

Genus of beetles

Aulacophora is a genus of beetles in the family Chrysomelidae, commonly known as pumpkin beetles; some species are pests of agricultural crops. The genus was named in 1836 by the French entomologist Louis Alexandre Auguste Chevrolat, in Dejean's Catalogue des Coléoptères. The name, from Ancient Greek, signifies "furrow-bearer"' from aulax, "furrow".

== Description ==
Beetles in this genus are oval insects up to about 8 mm (0.3 in) long and can be recognised by their presence on the host plant.

== Distribution ==
Pumpkin beetles are found in Africa, Asia and Australasia. Some of the more important pest species are A. foveicollis from Africa, Europe and Asia, A. similis from southern and southeastern Asia, A. coffeae from Malaysia, A. flavomarginata from Malaysia and Indonesia, A. femoralis from Myanmar and Vietnam, A. lewisii from Malaysia and Vietnam, and A. frontalis from Singapore, Thailand, Vietnam and Laos.

== Hosts ==
Beetles in this genus feed on members of the family Cucurbitaceae including cucumbers, pumpkins, melons, watermelons, gourds and squashes.

== Life cycle ==
The eggs, which are yellow, are laid in batches of up to five in the soil at the base of cucurbit plants. They hatch after eight to fifteen days and the larvae feed on the roots or tunnel into them, feeding for eighteen to thirty-five days and passing through four instar stages. They are creamy white at first but have turned yellowish-orange by the time they pupate in chambers in the ground. The adult beetles emerge after from four to fourteen days. They are strong fliers and disperse to other plants. The adult beetles may live for up to ten months and each female can lay in the order of five hundred eggs, so there can be several overlapping generations of beetles.

== Damage ==
Adult pumpkin beetles feed on the foliage and flowers of the host plants; seedlings may be destroyed by heavy attacks and young plants may be severely affected. Several beetles may cluster on a single leaf, leaving other leaves untouched. The beetles feed between the veins, often cutting and removing circular discs which they then eat. The larvae tunnel into the roots, which become swollen, discoloured and distorted, and the plant may die.

== Species ==
The following species have been described:

- Aulacophora abdominalis (Fabricius, 1781)
- Aulacophora aculeata Weise, 1908
- Aulacophora affinis (Montrouzier, 1855)
- Aulacophora albofasciata Baly, 1886
- Aulacophora analis (Weber, 1801)
- Aulacophora ancora (Redtenbacher, 1868)
- Aulacophora andamanica Duvivier, 1885
- Aulacophora antennata Baly, 1886
- Aulacophora apicicornis (Baly, 1889)
- Aulacophora apicipennis (Jacoby, 1894)
- Aulacophora apicipes (Jacoby, 1896)
- Aulacophora apiciventris Lea, 1924
- Aulacophora approximata (Baly, 1886)
- Aulacophora arcuata Allard, 1888
- Aulacophora atripennis (Fabricius, 1801)
- Aulacophora baliensis Barroga, 2001
- Aulacophora barrogae Reid, Halling & Beatson, 2021
- Aulacophora basalis (Jacoby, 1886)
- Aulacophora batesi Jacoby, 1884
- Aulacophora bhamoensis Jacoby, 1892
- Aulacophora bhimtalensis Gangola, 1969
- Aulacophora bicincta (Montrouzier, 1855)
- Aulacophora bicolor (Weber, 1801)
- Aulacophora bipartita (Baly, 1888)
- Aulacophora biplagiata Baly, 1889
- Aulacophora bipunctata (Olivier, 1808)
- Aulacophora blackburni (Bowditch, 1914)
- Aulacophora borrei (Baly, 1889)
- Aulacophora calva Anand & Cox, 1986
- Aulacophora carinicauda Chen & Kung, 1959
- Aulacophora carteri (Guerin-Meneville, 1830)
- Aulacophora castanea Allard, 1888
- Aulacophora celebensis (Jacoby, 1886)
- Aulacophora chapuisi Duvivier, 1884
- Aulacophora chlorotica (Olivier, 1808)
- Aulacophora cincta (Fabricius, 1775)
- Aulacophora cinctipennis Duvivier, 1884
- Aulacophora circumcincta (Duvivier, 1884)
- Aulacophora circumdata Blanchard, 1853
- Aulacophora coffeae (Hornstedt, 1788)
- Aulacophora coomani Laboissiere, 1929
- Aulacophora coralinsula (Gressitt, 1955)
- Aulacophora cornuta Baly, 1879
- Aulacophora costipennis (Baly, 1886)
- Aulacophora crassicornis Medvedev, 2001
- Aulacophora cristovallensis (Montrouzier, 1855)
- Aulacophora cruenta (Fabricius, 1781)
- Aulacophora cucullata Blackburn, 1896
- Aulacophora cyanoptera (Boisduval, 1835)
- Aulacophora danumensis Mohamedsaid, 1994
- Aulacophora deplanchei (Perroud, 1864)
- Aulacophora dimidiata (Guerin-Meneville, 1830)
- Aulacophora diversa Baly, 1889
- Aulacophora doesonensis Duvivier, 1884
- Aulacophora dorsalis (Boisduval, 1835)
- Aulacophora downesi Baly, 1886
- Aulacophora duboulayi Baly, 1886
- Aulacophora excavata Baly, 1886
- Aulacophora excisa (Baly, 1886)
- Aulacophora fallax (Weise, 1923)
- Aulacophora fasciata (Allard, 1888)
- Aulacophora ficus (Montrouzier, 1855)
- Aulacophora flavicornis Chapuis, 1876
- Aulacophora flaviventris Baly, 1886
- Aulacophora flavomarginata (Duvivier, 1884)
- Aulacophora formosa Chapuis, 1879
- Aulacophora foveata (Bowditch, 1925)
- Aulacophora foveicollis (Lucas, 1849)
- Aulacophora frontalis Baly, 1888
- Aulacophora frubstorferi (Duvivier, 1891)
- Aulacophora fulvimargo (Bryant, 1936)
- Aulacophora funesta (Weise, 1892)
- Aulacophora gestroi Jacoby, 1892
- Aulacophora hayashii (Gressitt, 1955)
- Aulacophora hilaris (Boisduval, 1835)
- Aulacophora impressa (Fabricius, 1801)
- Aulacophora indica (Gmelin, 1790)
- Aulacophora insularis Jacoby, 1886
- Aulacophora ioptera (Wiedemann, 1823)
- Aulacophora irpa Mohamedsaid, 1994
- Aulacophora jacobyi (Weise, 1924)
- Aulacophora kampeni (Weise, 1917)
- Aulacophora kinabaluensis Mohamedsaid, 1994
- Aulacophora kotoensis Chujo, 1962
- Aulacophora laevifrons (Baly, 1888)
- Aulacophora laysi Medvedev, 2001
- Aulacophora leopoldi Laboissiere, 1934
- Aulacophora lewisii Baly, 1886
- Aulacophora limbata (Illiger, 1800)
- Aulacophora loochooensis Chujo, 1957
- Aulacophora loriana Jacoby, 1904
- Aulacophora luteicornis (Fabricius, 1801)
- Aulacophora macropus (Montrouzier, 1855)
- Aulacophora marginalis (Chapuis, 1876)
- Aulacophora marginata Chapuis, 1876
- Aulacophora mariana (Chujo, 1943)
- Aulacophora martia (Weise, 1922)
- Aulacophora mbabaram Reid, Halling & Beatson, 2021
- Aulacophora medioflava Lea, 1924
- Aulacophora medvedevi Samoderzhenkov, 1992
- Aulacophora melanocephala Jacoby, 1892
- Aulacophora melanoptera (Boisduval, 1835)
- Aulacophora melanopus (Blanchard, 1853)
- Aulacophora melanura (Olivier, 1808)
- Aulacophora militaris Jacoby, 1894
- Aulacophora mimica Medvedev, 2001
- Aulacophora mjoebergi (Weise, 1916)
- Aulacophora moluccaensis (Laboissiere, 1932)
- Aulacophora montrouzieri (Fairmaire, 1883)
- Aulacophora mouhoti Baly, 1886
- Aulacophora naseemi Abdullah & Qureshi, 1968
- Aulacophora nigripennis Motschulsky, 1857
- Aulacophora nigrobrunnea (Maulik, 1929)
- Aulacophora nigropalgiata Jacoby, 1894
- Aulacophora nigrosignata (Baly, 1886)
- Aulacophora nilgiriensis Jacoby, 1903
- Aulacophora notulata (Fairmaire, 1850)
- Aulacophora nstabilis (Baly, 1886)
- Aulacophora nusantara Barroga, 2001
- Aulacophora oblonga (Gyllenhal, 1808)
- Aulacophora occipitalis (Baly, 1888)
- Aulacophora olivieri (Baly, 1888)
- Aulacophora opacipennis Chujo, 1962
- Aulacophora orientalis (Hornstedt, 1788)
- Aulacophora pahangi Mohamedsaid, 1994
- Aulacophora palliata (Schaller, 1783)
- Aulacophora pallidofasciata Jacoby, 1904
- Aulacophora pannonica Csiki, 1953
- Aulacophora papuana Jacoby, 1894
- Aulacophora parambikulamensis Maulik, 1936
- Aulacophora perroudi (Baly, 1888)
- Aulacophora plicaticollis (Allard, 1888)
- Aulacophora postica (Chapuis, 1876)
- Aulacophora posticalis (Guerin-Meneville, 1830)
- Aulacophora propinqua (Baly, 1886)
- Aulacophora pulchella Baly, 1879
- Aulacophora pygidialis (Baly, 1886)
- Aulacophora quadrimaculata (Fabricius, 1781)
- Aulacophora quadrinotata Chapuis, 1876
- Aulacophora quadripartia (Fairmaire, 1877)
- Aulacophora quadrispilota Fabricius, 1781
- Aulacophora quinqueplagiata (Duvivier, 1891)
- Aulacophora relicta (Boisduval, 1835)
- Aulacophora rigoensis Jacoby, 1904
- Aulacophora robusticornis Medvedev, 2001
- Aulacophora rosea (Fabricius, 1801)
- Aulacophora rubrontata Blanchard, 1853
- Aulacophora semilimbata Baly, 1886
- Aulacophora serena (Weise, 1923)
- Aulacophora signata Kirsch, 1866
- Aulacophora signata Kirsch, 1866
- Aulacophora smaragdipennis Duvivier, 1884
- Aulacophora sordidula (Weise, 1922)
- Aulacophora subcaerulea Jacoby, 1894
- Aulacophora tetraspilota (Baly, 1886)
- Aulacophora tibialis Chapuis, 1876
- Aulacophora transversa Allard, 1888
- Aulacophora tricolora (Weise, 1892)
- Aulacophora tristis Medvedev, 2001
- Aulacophora unicolor (Jacoby, 1883)
- Aulacophora varians Chapuis, 1876
- Aulacophora vicina (Boisduval, 1835)
- Aulacophora vietnamica Medvedev, 2001
- Aulacophora viridis Maulik, 1936
- Aulacophora vittula (Chapuis, 1876)
- Aulacophora wallacii Baly, 1886
- Aulacophora wilsoni Baly, 1888
- Aulacophora yunnanensis Chen & Kung, 1959

The following described species are considered nomina dubia, because their poor descriptions and missing type material mean they cannot be identified to species:

- Aulacophora artensis (Montrouzier, 1861) – from New Caledonia; probably a synonym of Aulacophora abdominalis (Fabricius, 1781), or possibly a pale form of Aulacophora deplanchei (Perroud, 1864); type material probably lost
- Aulacophora flavescens (Montrouzier, 1855) – from both Woodlark Island and San Cristoval Island; possibly a species of the Aulacophora indica species complex
- Aulacophora flaveola (Boisduval, 1835) – from New Guinea; formerly treated as a possible senior synonym of Aulacophora aruensis (Weise, 1892); not identifiable to genus
- Aulacophora punctata (Boisduval, 1835) – from New Guinea; not identifiable to genus
- Aulacophora scutellata (Boisduval, 1835) – from the "Pacific Ocean"; originally treated as a synonym of Aulacophora wilsoni Baly, 1888, but more likely a synonym of Candezea palustris (Perroud & Montrouzier, 1864)

The following are now synonyms of other species:

- Aulacophora almora Maulik, 1936: synonym of Aulacophora tibialis Chapuis, 1876
- Aulacophora argyrogaster (Montrouzier, 1861): synonym of Aulacophora abdominalis (Fabricius, 1781)
- Aulacophora armigera Baly, 1889: synonym of Aulacophora abdominalis (Fabricius, 1781)
- Aulacophora aruensis (Weise, 1892): synonym of Aulacophora abdominalis (Fabricius, 1781)
- Aulacophora ceramensis (Weise, 1892): synonym of Aulacophora indica (Gmelin, 1790)
- Aulacophora dohrni (Jacoby, 1899): synonym of Aulacophora tibialis Chapuis, 1876
- Aulacophora duvivieri Baly, 1886: synonym of Aulacophora cornuta Baly, 1879
- Aulacophora fabricii Baly, 1886: synonym of Aulacophora abdominalis (Fabricius, 1781)
- Aulacophora femoralis (Motschulsky, 1857): synonym of Aulacophora indica (Gmelin, 1790)
- Aulacophora flavipes (Jacoby, 1888): synonym of Aulacophora indica (Gmelin, 1790)
- Aulacophora niasiensis (Weise, 1892): synonym of Aulacophora indica (Gmelin, 1790)
- Aulacophora nigripalpis Chen & Kung, 1959: synonym of Aulacophora apicipes (Jacoby, 1896)
- Aulacophora quadraria (Olivier, 1808): synonym of Aulacophora analis (Weber, 1801)
- Aulacophora ritsemae Duvivier, 1884: synonym of Aulacophora tibialis Chapuis, 1876
- Aulacophora robusta Duvivier, 1884: synonym of Aulacophora cornuta Baly, 1879
- Aulacophora semifusca Jacoby, 1892: synonym of Aulacophora tibialis Chapuis, 1876
- Aulacophora similis (Olivier, 1808): synonym of Aulacophora indica (Gmelin, 1790)
- Aulacophora tenuicincta (Jacoby, 1897): synonym of Aulacophora apicipes (Jacoby, 1896)
- Aulacophora terminata (Jacoby, 1899): synonym of Aulacophora tibialis Chapuis, 1876
