= Anchomenus funebris =

Scientific classification
- Domain: Eukaryota
- Kingdom: Animalia
- Phylum: Arthropoda
- Class: Insecta
- Order: Coleoptera
- Suborder: Adephaga
- Family: Carabidae
- Genus: Anchomenus
- Species: A. funebris

Binomial name
- Anchomenus funebris (LeConte, 1854)

Synonyms
- Agonum funebre LeConte, 1854; Agonum morbillosum (Casey, 1920); Agonum nevadense Casey, 1920; Agonum opacellum (Casey, 1920); Agonum parvum (Casey, 1920); Agonum renoanum (Casey, 1920)

Species of beetle

Anchomenus funebris is a species of ground beetle in the family Carabidae. It is found in North America.
