= Battaristis amphiscolia =

Scientific classification
- Domain: Eukaryota
- Kingdom: Animalia
- Phylum: Arthropoda
- Class: Insecta
- Order: Lepidoptera
- Family: Gelechiidae
- Genus: Battaristis
- Species: B. amphiscolia

Binomial name
- Battaristis amphiscolia Meyrick, 1914

Species of moth

Battaristis amphiscolia is a moth of the family Gelechiidae. It was described by Edward Meyrick in 1914. It is found in Guyana.

The wingspan is 9–10 mm. The forewings are fuscous, greyer towards the costa anteriorly. The plical and second discal stigmata are sometimes obscurely indicated. There is a thick blackish streak along the costa from before the middle to near the apex attenuated anteriorly, cut by a very oblique fine white strigula from beyond the middle. There is also a fine white subterminal line from four-fifths of the costa to the tornus, acutely angulated in the middle and nearly reaching the termen beneath the apex, both portions curved inwards, the angle just cut by a fine black dash preceding it. The terminal space beyond this is irrorated (sprinkled) with whitish, the apical edge ochreous whitish. The hindwings are dark fuscous.
