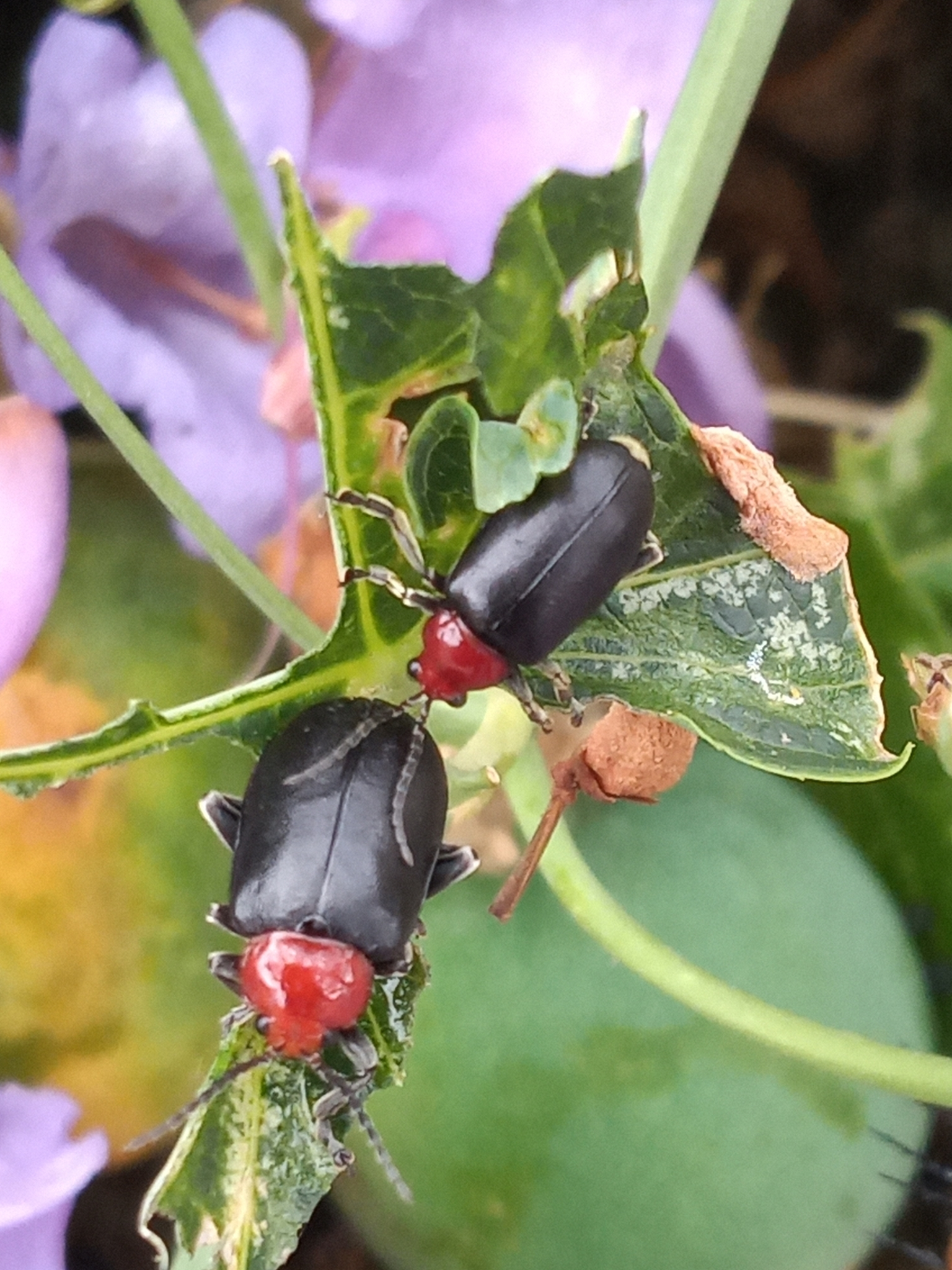
- Cacoscelis nigripennis, Argentina

Scientific classification
- Kingdom: Animalia
- Phylum: Arthropoda
- Class: Insecta
- Order: Coleoptera
- Suborder: Polyphaga
- Infraorder: Cucujiformia
- Family: Chrysomelidae
- Subfamily: Galerucinae
- Tribe: Alticini
- Genus: Cacoscelis; Chevrolat, 1836

= Cacoscelis =

Genus of flea beetles

Cacoscelis is a genus of flea beetles in the family Chrysomelidae, found in southern North America, Central America, and South America.

== Species ==
These 12 species belong to the genus Cacoscelis:

- Cacoscelis abdominalis Jacoby, 1904
- Cacoscelis argentinensis (Bechyné, 1951)
- Cacoscelis bicolorata Clark, 1865
- Cacoscelis coerulea Csiki, 1939
- Cacoscelis famelica (Fabricius, 1787)
- Cacoscelis flava Clark, 1865
- Cacoscelis lucens Erichson, 1847
- Cacoscelis marginata (Fabricius, 1775)
- Cacoscelis melanoptera (Germar, 1821)
- Cacoscelis nigripennis Clark, 1865
- Cacoscelis sallei Jacoby, 1884
- Cacoscelis varians Jacoby, 1891
