= Battaristis tricentrota =

Scientific classification
- Domain: Eukaryota
- Kingdom: Animalia
- Phylum: Arthropoda
- Class: Insecta
- Order: Lepidoptera
- Family: Gelechiidae
- Genus: Battaristis
- Species: B. tricentrota

Binomial name
- Battaristis tricentrota Meyrick, 1931

Species of moth

Battaristis tricentrota is a moth of the family Gelechiidae. It was described by Edward Meyrick in 1931. It is found in Brazil.
