= Anaches medioalbus =

Scientific classification
- Kingdom: Animalia
- Phylum: Arthropoda
- Class: Insecta
- Order: Coleoptera
- Suborder: Polyphaga
- Infraorder: Cucujiformia
- Family: Cerambycidae
- Genus: Anaches
- Species: A. medioalbus

Binomial name
- Anaches medioalbus (Breuning, 1956)

Synonyms
- Paramesosella medioalba Breuning, 1956; Sthenias semicylindricus Hayashi, 1974; Anaches semicylindricus (Hayashi, 1974); Anaches murzini Lazarev, 2020

Species of beetle

Anaches medioalbus is a species of beetle in the family Cerambycidae. It was described by Stephan von Breuning in 1956. It is known from Taiwan and China, including Hong Kong.

Anaches medioalbus measure 11.5–13.5 mm (0.45–0.53 in).
