= Battaristis curtella =

Scientific classification
- Domain: Eukaryota
- Kingdom: Animalia
- Phylum: Arthropoda
- Class: Insecta
- Order: Lepidoptera
- Family: Gelechiidae
- Genus: Battaristis
- Species: B. curtella

Binomial name
- Battaristis curtella (Busck, 1914)

Synonyms
- Anacampsis curtella Busck, 1914

Species of moth

Battaristis curtella is a moth of the family Gelechiidae. It was described by August Busck in 1914. It is found in Panama.

The wingspan is 10–11 mm. The forewings are dark grey, finely irrorated (speckled) with minute greenish ochreous dusting. The outer half of the costal edge has an oblique, white streaklet at apical the third and a perpendicular, white streaklet just before the apex. This latter nearly connects with a thin, perpendicular, white line across the wing, outside of which the tip of the wing is light grey with a single black longitudinal dash and a broad black marginal line narrowly edged with yellow. The hindwings are dark brownish fuscous with the basal half of the costa silvery white.
