= Aulacophora abdominalis =

Scientific classification
- Kingdom: Animalia
- Phylum: Arthropoda
- Clade: Pancrustacea
- Class: Insecta
- Order: Coleoptera
- Suborder: Polyphaga
- Infraorder: Cucujiformia
- Family: Chrysomelidae
- Genus: Aulacophora
- Species: A. abdominalis

Binomial name
- Aulacophora abdominalis (Fabricus, 1781)

Synonyms
- Aulacophora armigera Baly, 1889; Aulacophora fabricii Baly, 1886; Aulacophora fauveli Beenen, 2008; Crioceris abdominalis Fabricus, 1781; Raphidopalpa argyrogaster Montrouzier, 1861; Rhaphidopalpa aruensis Weise, 1892

Species of beetle

Aulacophora abdominalis is a species of leaf beetle in the genus Aulacophora.

== Distribution ==
A. abdominalis is widely distributed across the southwestern Pacific, stretching from Timor in the west to Niue in the east. The species has not been recorded from the Australian mainland, but approaches it at 60 km at Moa Island in the Torres Strait Islands.
