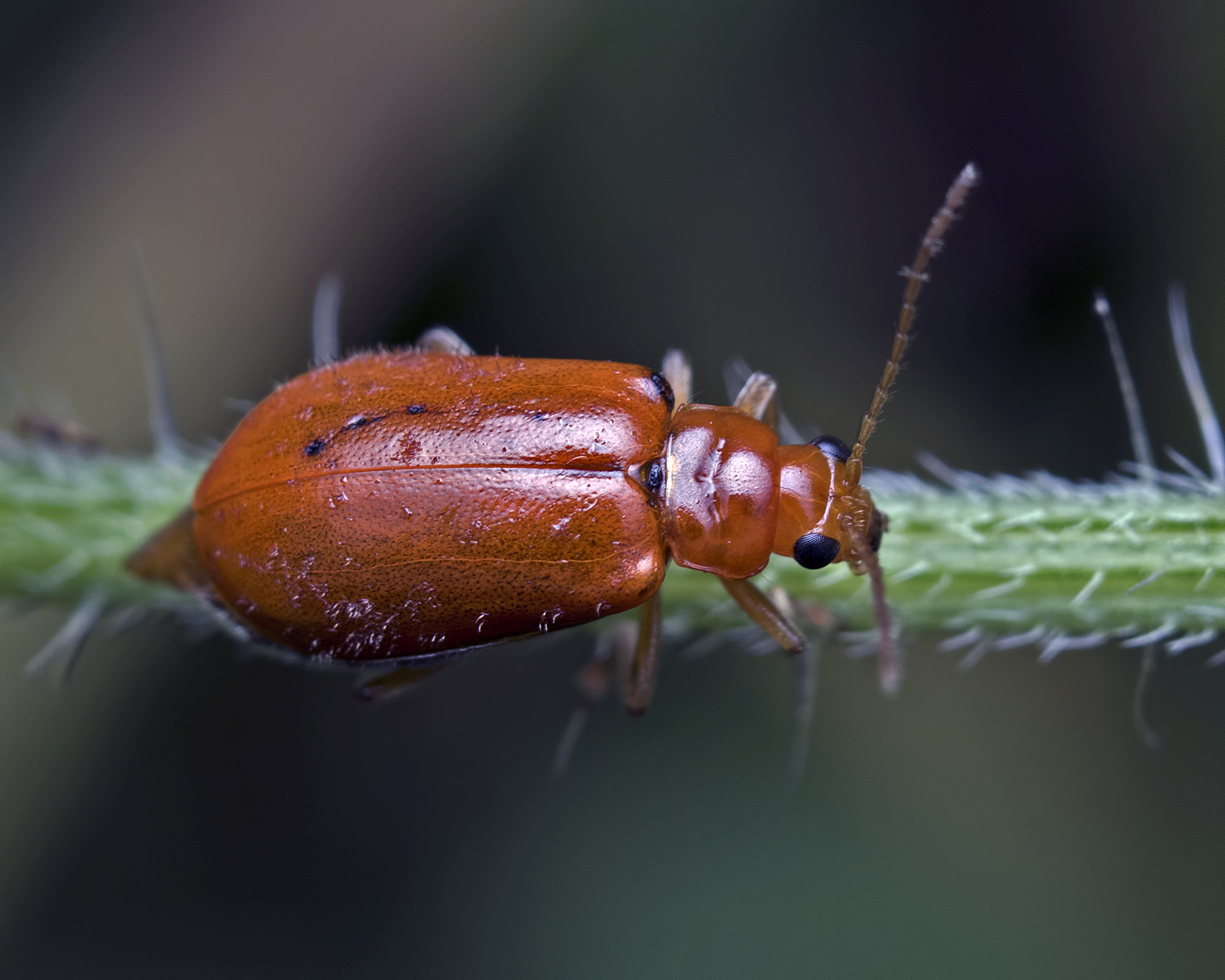

Scientific classification
- Kingdom: Animalia
- Phylum: Arthropoda
- Class: Insecta
- Order: Coleoptera
- Suborder: Polyphaga
- Infraorder: Cucujiformia
- Family: Chrysomelidae
- Genus: Aulacophora
- Species: A. foveicollis

Binomial name
- Aulacophora foveicollis (Lucas, 1849)

Synonyms
- Galleruca foveicollis Lucas, 1849; Raphidopalpa foveicollis (Lucas, 1849); Galleruca nigriventris Rosenhauer, 1850; Rhaphidopalpa africana Weise, 1903; Aulacophora africana (Weise, 1903)

= Aulacophora foveicollis =

Species of beetle

Aulacophora foveicollis, the red pumpkin beetle, is a species of beetle in the family Chrysomelidae. It is a foliar pest of members of the Cucurbitaceae, particularly the pumpkin. It is also a pest of millets in India.

== Description ==
The adult Aulacophora foveicollis measures 5 to 8 mm (0.2 to 0.3 in) in length and about 3.5 mm (0.14 in) in breadth. The colour of the elytra varies from pale orange-yellow to bright orange-red to medium brown, and the abdomen is black with soft white hairs. The grubs are found in the soil and are slender and creamy-yellow, with pale brown heads and prothorax.

== Distribution ==
A. foveicollis has a wide distribution across southern Europe, Asia, Australia and Africa. It is a serious pest of cucurbit crops in northwestern India.

== Life cycle ==
In northern India, the beetles hibernate over winter, emerging in March. After mating the female lays batches of about eight eggs in the soil. The eggs are orange and oval and hatch in one to two weeks. The grubs at first feed on leaf debris, roots and parts of the host plant in contact with the soil. They pass through four moults as they grow, and pupate in earthen chambers just below the surface of the soil. After a further week to two and a half weeks, the adult beetles emerge, climb the host plant and start feeding. The females start laying eggs within a week or so. There may be five generations over the course of the summer.

== Biology ==
The beetles are most destructive in March and April while the plants are small. They feed on the leaves, buds and flowers and can defoliate the plants; the grubs bore into the roots and damage the stems and fruits that lie on the soil. A. foveicollis favours pumpkin (Cucurbita maxima) over other curcurbit crops, but will also feed on squash (Cucurbita pepo), melon (Cucumis melo), cucumber (Cucurbita sativus), watermelon (Citrullus lanatus) and the sponge gourd (Luffa aegyptiaca). There are extrafloral nectaries on the sponge gourd which attract ants. The dominant species of ant in India and much of southeastern Asia is Camponotus compressus, and the presence of ants on the crop plant has a deterrent effect on A. foveicollis.
