= Battaristis ardiophora =

Scientific classification
- Domain: Eukaryota
- Kingdom: Animalia
- Phylum: Arthropoda
- Class: Insecta
- Order: Lepidoptera
- Family: Gelechiidae
- Genus: Battaristis
- Species: B. ardiophora

Binomial name
- Battaristis ardiophora Meyrick, 1914

Species of moth

Battaristis ardiophora is a moth of the family Gelechiidae. It was described by Edward Meyrick in 1914. It is found in Guyana, Brazil and Peru.

The wingspan is 8–9 mm. The forewings are pale brownish ochreous, towards the costa anteriorly whitish ochreous. The dorsum is dark fuscous towards the base and the costal edge is black from the base to a small fine wedge-shaped mark at one-fourth. There is a thick dark fuscous streak along the costa from two-fifths to near the apex, attenuated anteriorly, cut by a fine white very oblique strigula from the costa beyond the middle. A small obscure oblique fuscous mark is found beneath the fold at one-fourth. The stigmata are minute, obscure and dark fuscous, the plical obliquely before the first discal. There is a fine white subterminal line from three-fourths of the costa to the tornus, acutely angulated in the middle, both halves slightly sinuate inwards, its angle just reached or hardly cut by a fine black dash preceding it, which is connected with the second discal stigma by a suffused whitish dash, beneath this a minute black strigula touching the line and preceded by a short whitish dash. Some fuscous suffusion is found towards the dorsum before this line and the tornal area beyond this line is irrorated with whitish and sometimes fuscous. The hindwings are dark fuscous.
