= Anchomenus quadratus =

Scientific classification
- Kingdom: Animalia
- Phylum: Arthropoda
- Class: Insecta
- Order: Coleoptera
- Suborder: Adephaga
- Family: Carabidae
- Genus: Anchomenus
- Species: A. quadratus

Binomial name
- Anchomenus quadratus (LeConte, 1854)

Synonyms
- Platynus quadratus LeConte, 1854b; Anchomenus cornicula Casey, 1920; Anchomenus metuens Casey, 1920; Anchomenus dilleyanus Casey, 1920

Species of beetle

Anchomenus quadratus is a species of beetle in the family Carabidae. It is found in British Columbia, Canada and the U.S. states such as California, Oregon, and Washington.
