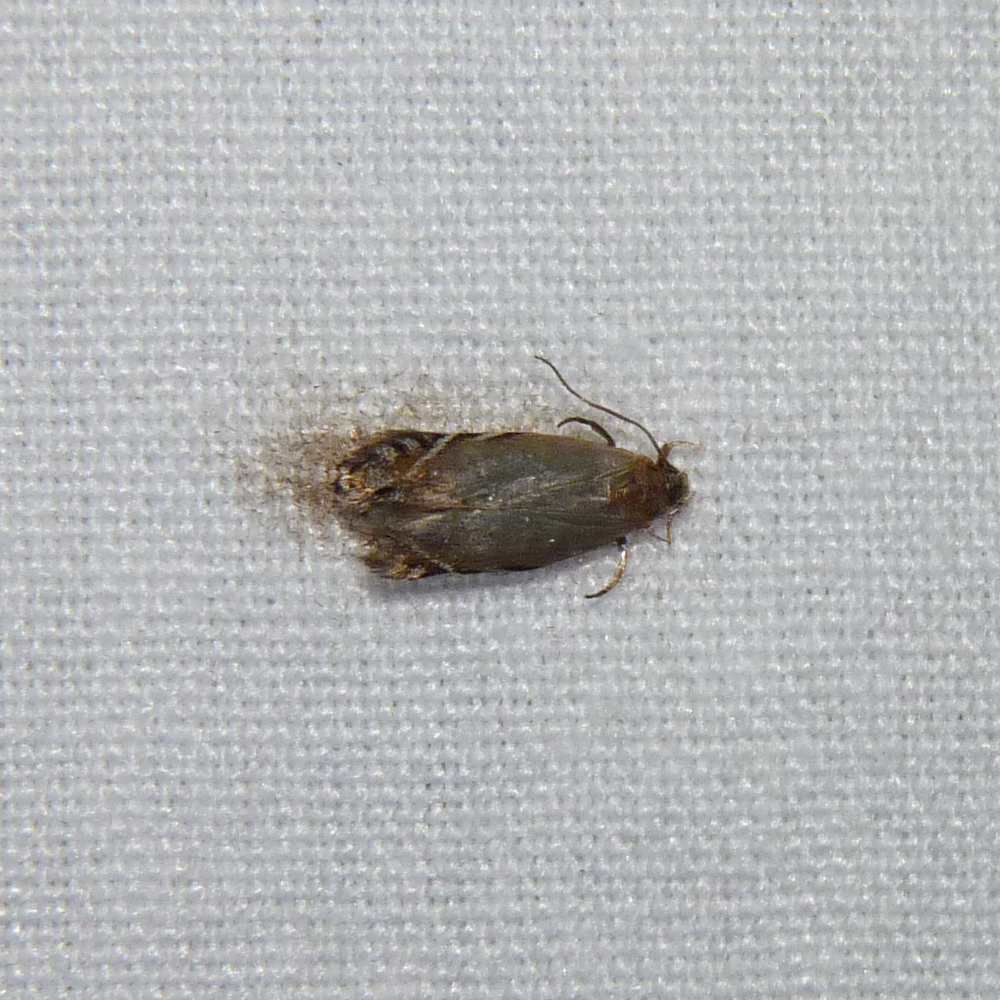
- Battaristis concinusella

Scientific classification
- Domain: Eukaryota
- Kingdom: Animalia
- Phylum: Arthropoda
- Class: Insecta
- Order: Lepidoptera
- Family: Gelechiidae
- Subfamily: Anacampsinae
- Genus: Battaristis; Meyrick, 1914

Synonyms
- Duvita Busck, 1916

= Battaristis =

Genus of moths

Battaristis is a genus of moths in the family Gelechiidae.

== Species ==
- Battaristis acroglypta Meyrick, 1929
- Battaristis amphiscolia Meyrick, 1914
- Battaristis ardiophora Meyrick, 1914
- Battaristis atelesta Meyrick, 1914
- Battaristis bistrigella (Busck, 1914)
- Battaristis concinusella (Chambers, 1877)
- Battaristis concisa Meyrick, 1929
- Battaristis coniosema Meyrick, 1922
- Battaristis curtella (Busck, 1914)
- Battaristis cyclella (Busck, 1903)
- Battaristis emissurella (Walker, 1864)
- Battaristis ichnota Meyrick, 1914
- Battaristis melanamba Meyrick, 1914
- Battaristis nigratomella (Clemens, 1863)
- Battaristis orthocampta Meyrick, 1914
- Battaristis parazela Meyrick, 1929
- Battaristis pasadenae (Keifer, 1935)
- Battaristis perinaeta (Walsingham, 1910)
- Battaristis prismatopa Meyrick, 1914
- Battaristis rhythmodes Meyrick, 1929
- Battaristis sphenodelta Meyrick, 1922
- Battaristis stereogramma Meyrick, 1914
- Battaristis symphora (Walsingham, 1911)
- Battaristis syngraphopa Meyrick, 1922
- Battaristis synocha Meyrick, 1922
- Battaristis tricentrota Meyrick, 1931
- Battaristis unistrigella (Busck, 1914)
- Battaristis vittella (Busck, 1916)
