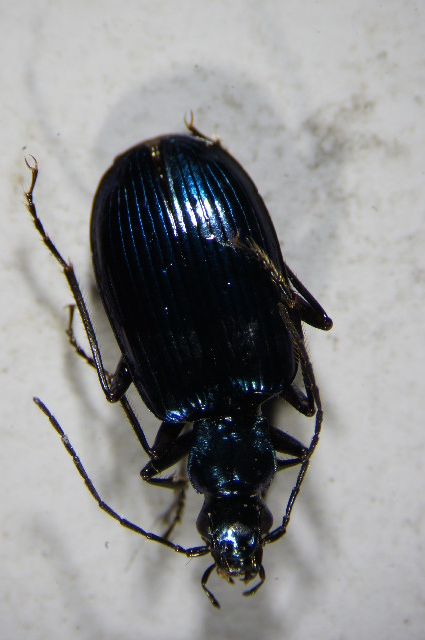
- Anchomenus cyaneus

Scientific classification
- Domain: Eukaryota
- Kingdom: Animalia
- Phylum: Arthropoda
- Class: Insecta
- Order: Coleoptera
- Suborder: Adephaga
- Family: Carabidae
- Genus: Anchomenus
- Species: A. cyaneus

Binomial name
- Anchomenus cyaneus Dejean, 1828

Synonyms
- Anchomenus cyanescens

= Anchomenus cyaneus =

Species of beetle

Anchomenus cyaneus is a species of ground beetle in the Platyninae subfamily that can be found in Austria, France, Germany, Italy, Portugal, Spain and Switzerland.
