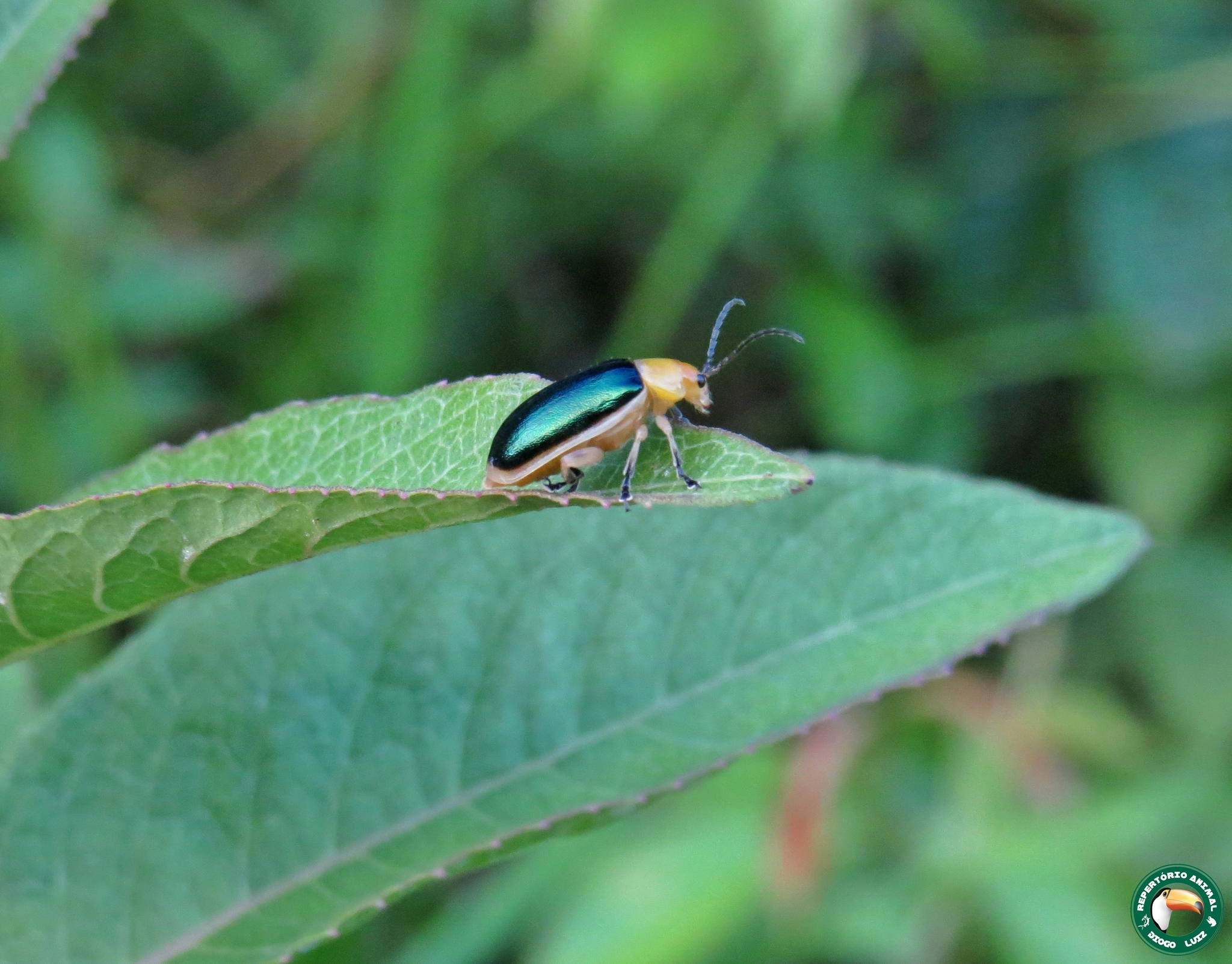
- Cacoscelis marginata, Brasil

Scientific classification
- Kingdom: Animalia
- Phylum: Arthropoda
- Class: Insecta
- Order: Coleoptera
- Suborder: Polyphaga
- Infraorder: Cucujiformia
- Family: Chrysomelidae
- Subfamily: Galerucinae
- Tribe: Alticini
- Genus: Cacoscelis
- Species: C. marginata

Binomial name
- Cacoscelis marginata (Fabricius, 1775)

= Cacoscelis marginata =

Species of flea beetle

Cacoscelis marginata is a species of flea beetle in the family Chrysomelidae. It lives in Peru.

== Subspecies ==
These two subspecies belong to the species Cacoscelis marginata:

- Cacoscelis marginata binotata (Illiger, 1807)
- Cacoscelis marginata marginata (Fabricius, 1775)
