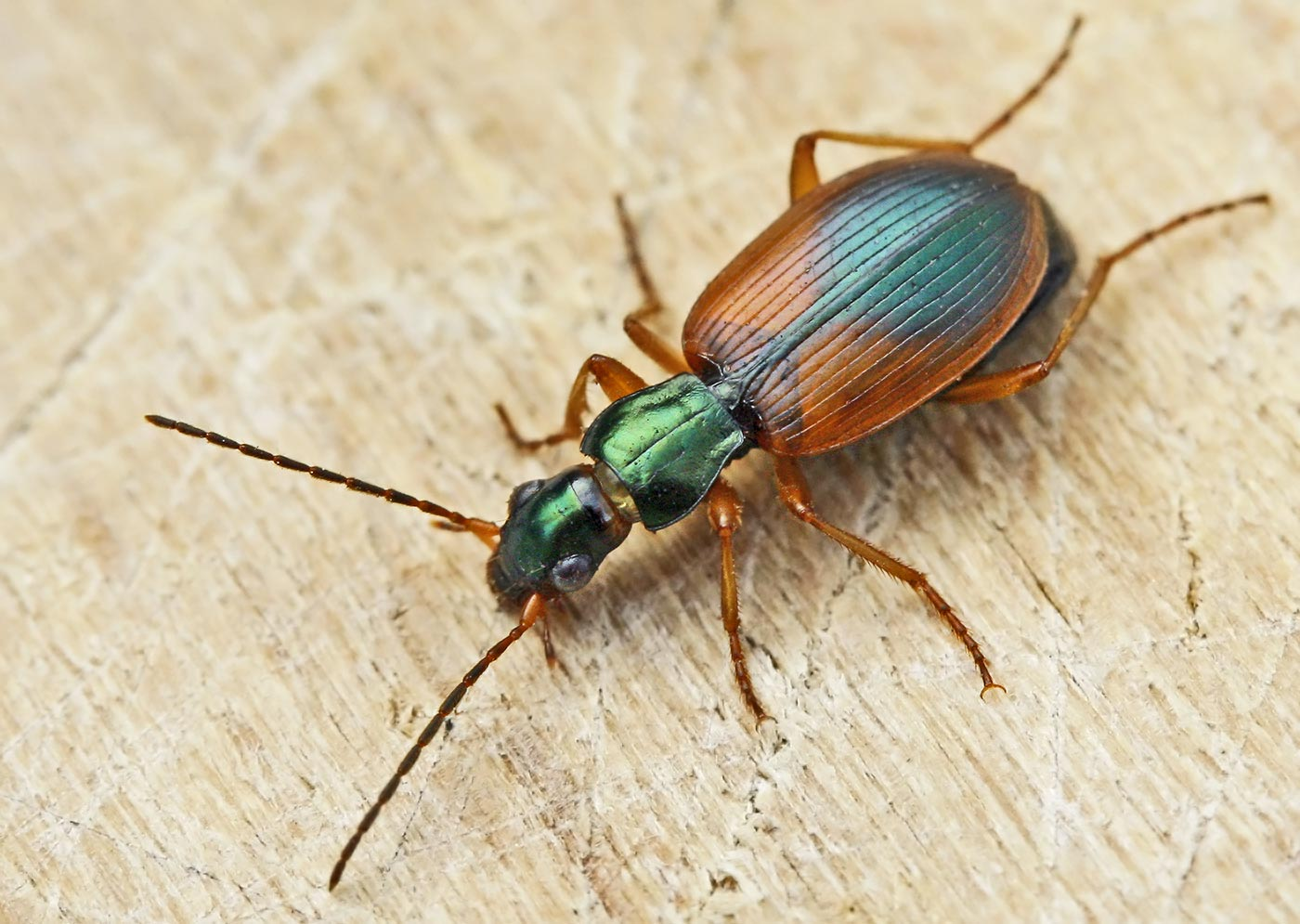
- Anchomenus dorsalis

Scientific classification
- Domain: Eukaryota
- Kingdom: Animalia
- Phylum: Arthropoda
- Class: Insecta
- Order: Coleoptera
- Suborder: Adephaga
- Family: Carabidae
- Subfamily: Platyninae
- Tribe: Platynini
- Genus: Anchomenus; Bonelli, 1810

Subgenera
- Anchodemus Motschulsky, 1865; Anchomenus Bonelli, 1810

= Anchomenus =

Genus of beetles

Anchomenus is a genus of ground beetle native to the Palearctic (including Europe), the Near East and North Africa.

== Species ==
These 18 species belong to the genus Anchomenus:

- Anchomenus aeneolus (LeConte, 1854)
- Anchomenus alcedo J.Schmidt, 2014
- Anchomenus bellus J.Schmidt, 2014
- Anchomenus capensis Liebherr, 1991
- Anchomenus cyaneus Dejean, 1828
- Anchomenus dohrnii Fairmaire, 1866
- Anchomenus dorsalis (Pontoppidan, 1763)
- Anchomenus funebris (LeConte, 1854)
- Anchomenus kataevi J.Schmidt, 2014
- Anchomenus kurnakovi (Kryzhanovskij, 1983)
- Anchomenus leucopus Bates, 1873
- Anchomenus quadratus (LeConte, 1854)
- Anchomenus suensoni (Mandl, 1981)
- Anchomenus turkestanicus Ballion, 1871
- Anchomenus virescens (Motschulsky, 1865)
- Anchomenus yukihikoi (Habu, 1962)
- † Anchomenus bipunctatus Forster, 1891
- † Anchomenus orphanus Heer, 1847
