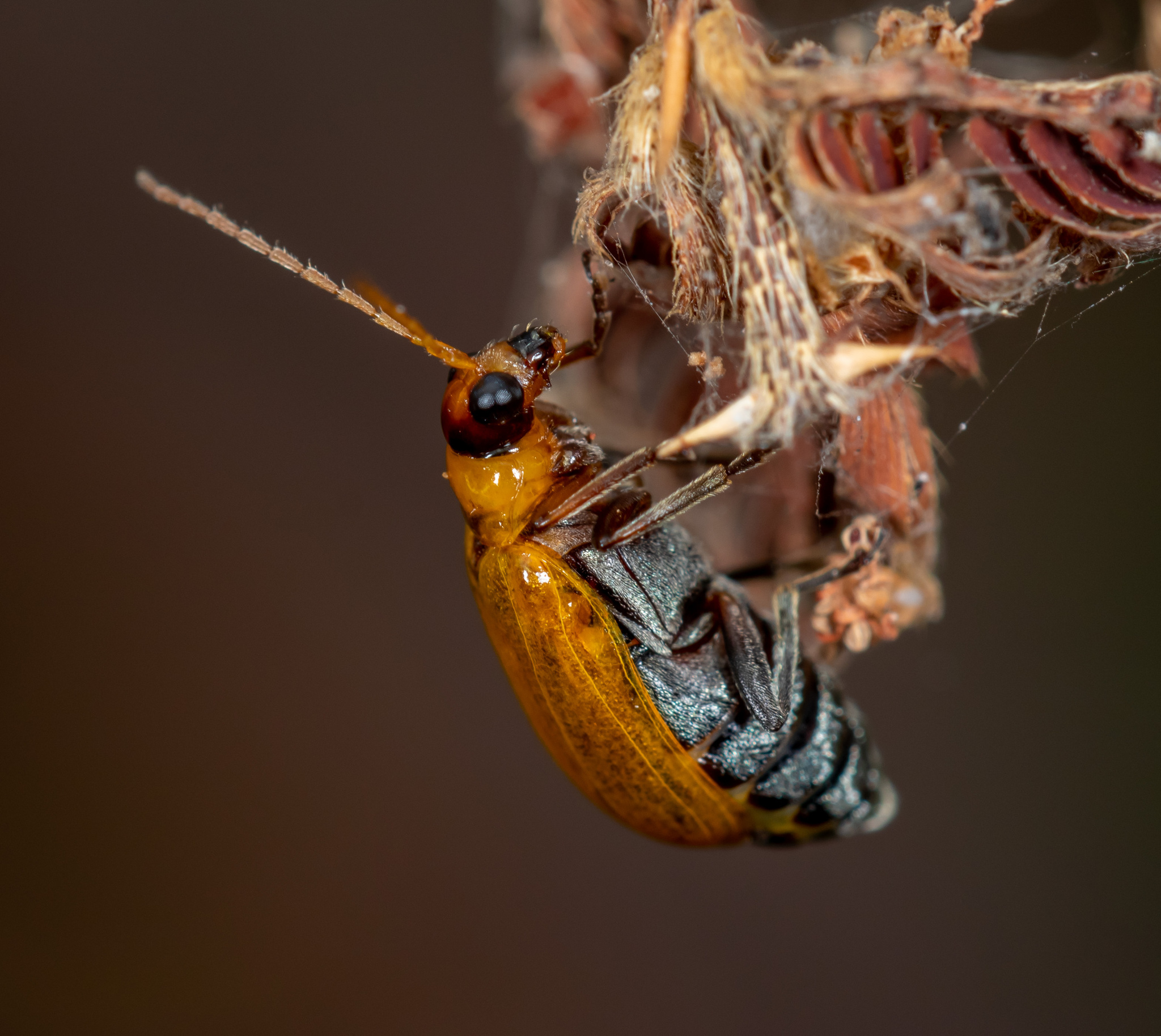
- A. coffeae from Thailand

Scientific classification
- Kingdom: Animalia
- Phylum: Arthropoda
- Clade: Pancrustacea
- Class: Insecta
- Order: Coleoptera
- Suborder: Polyphaga
- Infraorder: Cucujiformia
- Family: Chrysomelidae
- Genus: Aulacophora
- Species: A. coffeae

Binomial name
- Aulacophora coffeae (Hornstedt, 1788)

Synonyms
- Ceratia coffeae Rhaphidopalpa coffeae

= Aulacophora coffeae =

Species of beetle

Aulacophora coffeae is a species of beetles in the family Chrysomelidae.

Among its host plants seem to be melons.

== Description ==
The head, labrum, ventral surfaces and legs are black, with a brownish pronotum and elytra.

== Distribution ==
This species is native to Southeast Asia, and has been found from Thailand to Indonesia.
