= Battaristis ichnota =

Scientific classification
- Domain: Eukaryota
- Kingdom: Animalia
- Phylum: Arthropoda
- Class: Insecta
- Order: Lepidoptera
- Family: Gelechiidae
- Genus: Battaristis
- Species: B. ichnota

Binomial name
- Battaristis ichnota Meyrick, 1914

Species of moth

Battaristis ichnota is a moth of the family Gelechiidae. It was described by Edward Meyrick in 1914. It is found in Guyana.

The wingspan is 10–11 mm. The forewings are light ochreous brownish, towards the apex light ferruginous ochreous, somewhat mixed with whitish in the disc and with the costal edge blackish towards the base, with a black dot at the base. There are short oblique blackish marks towards the costa at one-fifth and two-fifths, and beneath the fold at one-fourth. The stigmata are black, partially edged with whitish, the plical and second discal forming oblique marks, the plical rather obliquely before the first discal, space between the stigmata suffused with fuscous. The dorsum is rather widely suffused with fuscous from the base to the subterminal line and there is an elongate gradually dilated wedge-shaped black patch extending along the costa from one-third to the subterminal line, cut by a fine white oblique strigula from beyond the middle of the costa. A fine white subterminal line is found from three-fourths of the costa to the tornus, acutely angulated in the middle, sinuate inwards on the lower half, the angle interrupted by a short blackish dash projecting from the dark suffusion of the dorsal half of the wing. There are also some light grey dots around the apical part of the costa and termen. The hindwings are dark fuscous, thinly scaled in the disc anteriorly.
