= Aulacophora apicipes =

Scientific classification
- Kingdom: Animalia
- Phylum: Arthropoda
- Clade: Pancrustacea
- Class: Insecta
- Order: Coleoptera
- Suborder: Polyphaga
- Infraorder: Cucujiformia
- Family: Chrysomelidae
- Genus: Aulacophora
- Species: A. apicipes

Binomial name
- Aulacophora apicipes Jacoby, 1896

Synonyms
- Aulacophora nigripalpis Chen & Kung, 1959; Aulacophora tenuicincta Jacoby, 1897

Species of beetle

Aulacophora apicipes is a species of leaf beetle in the genus Aulacophora.
