= Battaristis orthocampta =

Scientific classification
- Domain: Eukaryota
- Kingdom: Animalia
- Phylum: Arthropoda
- Class: Insecta
- Order: Lepidoptera
- Family: Gelechiidae
- Genus: Battaristis
- Species: B. orthocampta

Binomial name
- Battaristis orthocampta Meyrick, 1914

Species of moth

Battaristis orthocampta is a moth of the family Gelechiidae. It was described by Edward Meyrick in 1914. It is found in Guyana.

The wingspan is 9–10 mm. The forewings are grey or pale greyish ochreous, somewhat tinged with fuscous towards the dorsum and with a black dot beneath the fold at one-fourth. The plical and second discal stigmata are blackish and there is a thick blackish streak along the costa from two-fifths to the apex, attenuated anteriorly, cut by a fine white very oblique strigula from the costa beyond the middle. There is a fine black dash in the disc beyond the second discal stigma, not reaching the subterminal line and there is sometimes a blackish mark on the dorsum before the subterminal line. A fine whitish subterminal line is found from three-fourths of the costa to the tornus, right angled in the middle, both portions straight. A white bar connects the angle of this line with the termen beneath the apex, including a fine black strigula posteriorly. The terminal area beneath this is fuscous, irrorated (sprinkled) with whitish and there is a minute whitish dot on the costa near the apex. The hindwings are dark fuscous.
