= Battaristis sphenodelta =

Scientific classification
- Domain: Eukaryota
- Kingdom: Animalia
- Phylum: Arthropoda
- Class: Insecta
- Order: Lepidoptera
- Family: Gelechiidae
- Genus: Battaristis
- Species: B. sphenodelta

Binomial name
- Battaristis sphenodelta Meyrick, 1922

Species of moth

Battaristis sphenodelta is a moth of the family Gelechiidae. It was described by Edward Meyrick in 1922. It is found in Brazil.

The wingspan is about 9 mm. The forewings are whitish ochreous, the costa suffused with white anteriorly and there is an elongate-triangular blackish blotch on the middle of the costa, as well as a wedge-shaped black costal blotch from just beyond this to near the apex, cut by a fine white subterminal line from three-fourths of the costa to the tornus, right angled in the middle and marked with a black dash on the angle. The apical area beyond this is brownish tinged, with some whitish suffusion towards the apex and along the termen. The hindwings are grey.
