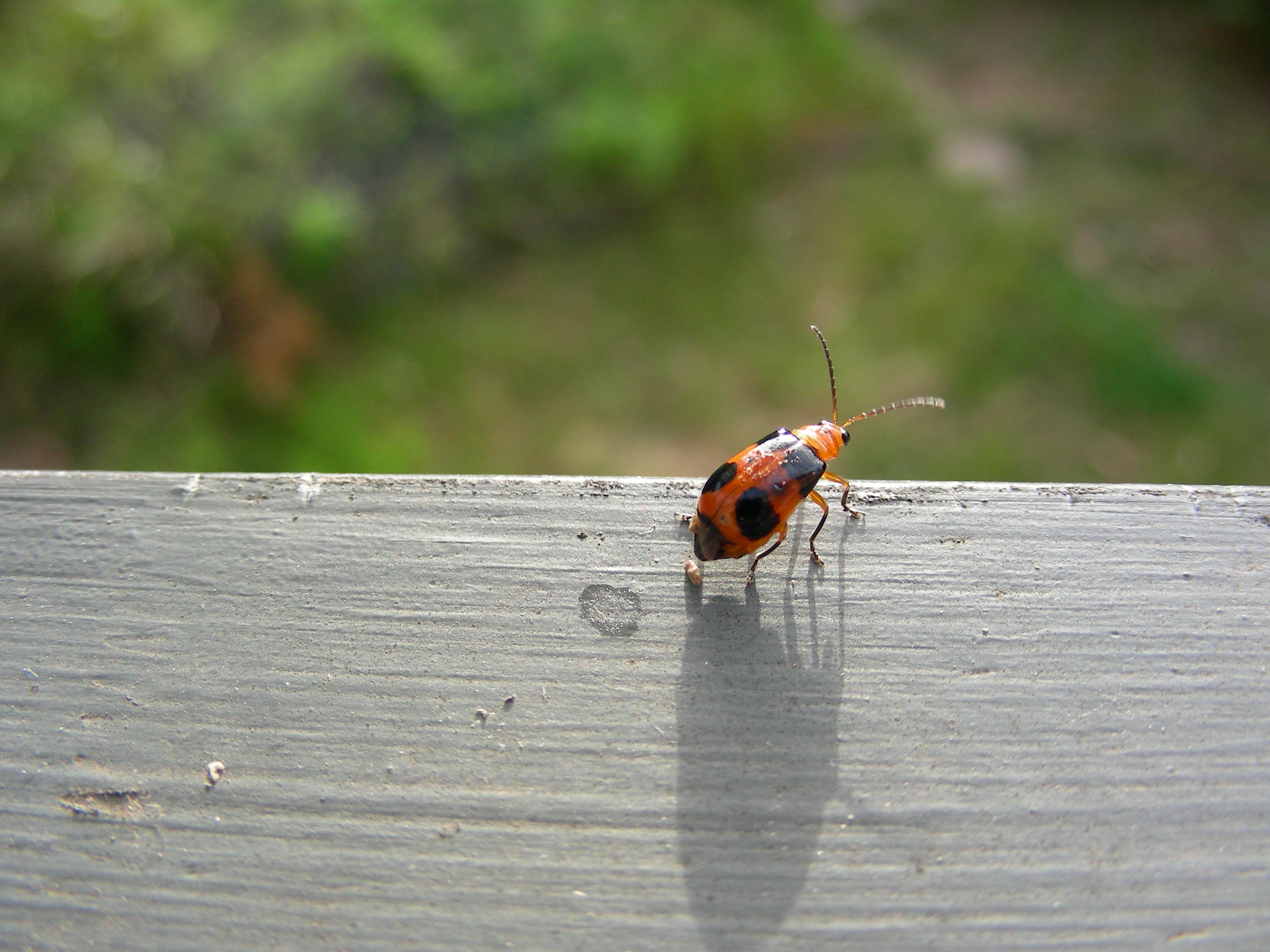

Scientific classification
- Kingdom: Animalia
- Phylum: Arthropoda
- Clade: Pancrustacea
- Class: Insecta
- Order: Coleoptera
- Suborder: Polyphaga
- Infraorder: Cucujiformia
- Family: Chrysomelidae
- Genus: Aulacophora
- Species: A. hilaris

Binomial name
- Aulacophora hilaris (Boisduval, 1835)

= Aulacophora hilaris =

Species of beetle

Aulacophora hilaris, also known as Pumpkin Beetle, Banded Pumpkin Beetle, Pumpkin Flea Beetle or Spotted Pumpkin Beetle, is a beetle in the genus Aulacophora that is found in Australia.

== Description ==
Aulacophora hilaris is orange and has four distinct black spots on its wing covers and has a length of 6 mm - 7 mm.

== Distribution ==
Aulacophora hilaris is found in Eastern Australia, including in the Sydney area.

== As a pest ==
Aulacophora hilaris is considered a pest as it feeds on members of the family Cucurbitaceae, which includes cucumbers and pumpkins hence its common name.
