= Aulacophora analis =

Scientific classification
- Kingdom: Animalia
- Phylum: Arthropoda
- Clade: Pancrustacea
- Class: Insecta
- Order: Coleoptera
- Suborder: Polyphaga
- Infraorder: Cucujiformia
- Family: Chrysomelidae
- Genus: Aulacophora
- Species: A. analis

Binomial name
- Aulacophora analis (Weber, 1801)

Synonyms
- Galeruca quadraria Olivier, 1808; Galleruca analis Weber, 1801

Species of beetle

Aulacophora analis is a species of leaf beetle in the genus Aulacophora. It was first described by Friedrich Weber in 1801.
