= Battaristis cyclella =

Scientific classification
- Domain: Eukaryota
- Kingdom: Animalia
- Phylum: Arthropoda
- Class: Insecta
- Order: Lepidoptera
- Family: Gelechiidae
- Genus: Battaristis
- Species: B. cyclella

Binomial name
- Battaristis cyclella (Busck, 1903)

Synonyms
- Anacampsis cyclella Busck, 1903

Species of moth

Battaristis cyclella is a moth of the family Gelechiidae. It was described by August Busck in 1903. It is found in North America, where it has been recorded from Arizona and Utah.

The wingspan is 14-14.5 mm. The forewings are whitish yellow shaded with darker fawn. On the middle of the dorsal edge is a large, semicircular, dark olive-brown spot, reaching to the middle of the wing and edged with white. The apical half of the costal edge is of this same dark brown colour, interrupted by four oblique white streaks, the first near the middle of the wing, the second at the beginning of the costal cilia, both directed outward. The two last streaks are smaller nearer the apex and directed inward. The second costal streak is faintly continued in a thin, outwardly pointed, V-shaped fascia, at the tip of which is a longitudinal black dash, edged with white scales. Above and below this dash, outside of the faint white fascia, the wing is finely checkered with black and white scales. On the middle of the wing at the end of the cell is a small, dark brown, oblong spot. The hindwings are dark olive brown, lighter and silvery toward the base.
