= Battaristis synocha =

Scientific classification
- Domain: Eukaryota
- Kingdom: Animalia
- Phylum: Arthropoda
- Class: Insecta
- Order: Lepidoptera
- Family: Gelechiidae
- Genus: Battaristis
- Species: B. synocha

Binomial name
- Battaristis synocha Meyrick, 1922

Species of moth

Battaristis synocha is a moth of the family Gelechiidae. It was described by Edward Meyrick in 1922. It is found in Peru.

The wingspan is 8–9 mm. The forewings are light greyish ochreous, paler towards the costa anteriorly and the costal edge anteriorly blackish. There is an irregular thick upcurved blackish-fuscous streak from towards the dorsum before the middle to the disc at two-thirds and a very oblique blackish strigula from the costa at one-third. A thick bronze-brown streak, irregularly suffused with black, is found towards the costa from near beyond this to the apex, anteriorly acute, cut by a very oblique fine white line from the middle of the costa, and one less oblique from three-fourths, making a very acute angular projection in the middle and continued to the dorsum before the tornus, both halves sinuate inwards, the projection enclosing a very fine black dash. The hindwings are dark fuscous.
