= Aulacophora arcuata =

Scientific classification
- Kingdom: Animalia
- Phylum: Arthropoda
- Clade: Pancrustacea
- Class: Insecta
- Order: Coleoptera
- Suborder: Polyphaga
- Infraorder: Cucujiformia
- Family: Chrysomelidae
- Genus: Aulacophora
- Species: A. arcuata

Binomial name
- Aulacophora arcuata Allard, 1888

Species of beetle

Aulacophora arcuata is a species of leaf beetles in the genus Aulacophora.
