= Battaristis syngraphopa =

Scientific classification
- Domain: Eukaryota
- Kingdom: Animalia
- Phylum: Arthropoda
- Class: Insecta
- Order: Lepidoptera
- Family: Gelechiidae
- Genus: Battaristis
- Species: B. syngraphopa

Binomial name
- Battaristis syngraphopa Meyrick, 1922

Species of moth

Battaristis syngraphopa is a moth of the family Gelechiidae. It was described by Edward Meyrick in 1922. It is found in Brazil and Peru.

The wingspan is 9–10 mm. The forewings are light grey, posteriorly suffused with darker grey or sometimes brownish tinged and there is a transverse dark fuscous spot crossing the fold at one-fourth. A cloudy dark fuscous dot is found towards the costa at one-third. The stigmata are cloudy and dark fuscous, the discal approximated, the plical rather obliquely before the first discal. There is a very oblique white strigula from the middle of the costa, preceded by an elongate dark fuscous mark, a similar mark preceding the subterminal line and a fine white line from three-fourths of the costa to the tornus, obtusely angulated in the middle, the upper half straight, the lower slightly sinuate. There is also a small blackish suboval apical spot and a subapical dash, separated by a white dash, above and beneath these marginal spots of white suffusion. The hindwings are dark grey.
