= Aulacophora affinis =

Scientific classification
- Kingdom: Animalia
- Phylum: Arthropoda
- Clade: Pancrustacea
- Class: Insecta
- Order: Coleoptera
- Suborder: Polyphaga
- Infraorder: Cucujiformia
- Family: Chrysomelidae
- Genus: Aulacophora
- Species: A. affinis

Binomial name
- Aulacophora affinis Montrouzier, 1855

Species of beetle

Aulacophora affinis is a species of leaf beetle in the genus Aulacophora.
