= Battaristis symphora =

Scientific classification
- Domain: Eukaryota
- Kingdom: Animalia
- Phylum: Arthropoda
- Class: Insecta
- Order: Lepidoptera
- Family: Gelechiidae
- Genus: Battaristis
- Species: B. symphora

Binomial name
- Battaristis symphora (Walsingham, 1911)

Synonyms
- Untomia symphora Walsingham, 1911

Species of moth

Battaristis symphora is a moth of the family Gelechiidae. It was described by Thomas de Grey, 6th Baron Walsingham, in 1911. It is found in Mexico (Tabasco).

The wingspan is about 7 mm. The forewings are whitish on the costal half towards the base, becoming greyish towards the dorsum and brownish ochreous about and beyond the end of the cell. At the extreme base of the costa is a slender black streak, followed by a very short oblique black streak at one-fourth and a broader oblique black streak at the middle. This is separated by a narrow oblique white streak from an elongate blackish costal blotch, which is somewhat triangular and terminates in a curved reduplicated blackish line in the apical cilia. This blotch contains an outwardly oblique slender line, pointing to a small black spot in a white patch before the apex, another slender white line meeting it at an angle from the dorsum. A small pale space on the fold at about half the wing-length contains a few blackish scales and the terminal cilia are hoary, speckled with greyish fuscous. The hindwings are greyish brown.
