= Battaristis rhythmodes =

Scientific classification
- Domain: Eukaryota
- Kingdom: Animalia
- Phylum: Arthropoda
- Class: Insecta
- Order: Lepidoptera
- Family: Gelechiidae
- Genus: Battaristis
- Species: B. rhythmodes

Binomial name
- Battaristis rhythmodes Meyrick, 1929

Species of moth

Battaristis rhythmodes is a moth of the family Gelechiidae. It was described by Edward Meyrick in 1929. It is found in Pará, Brazil.
