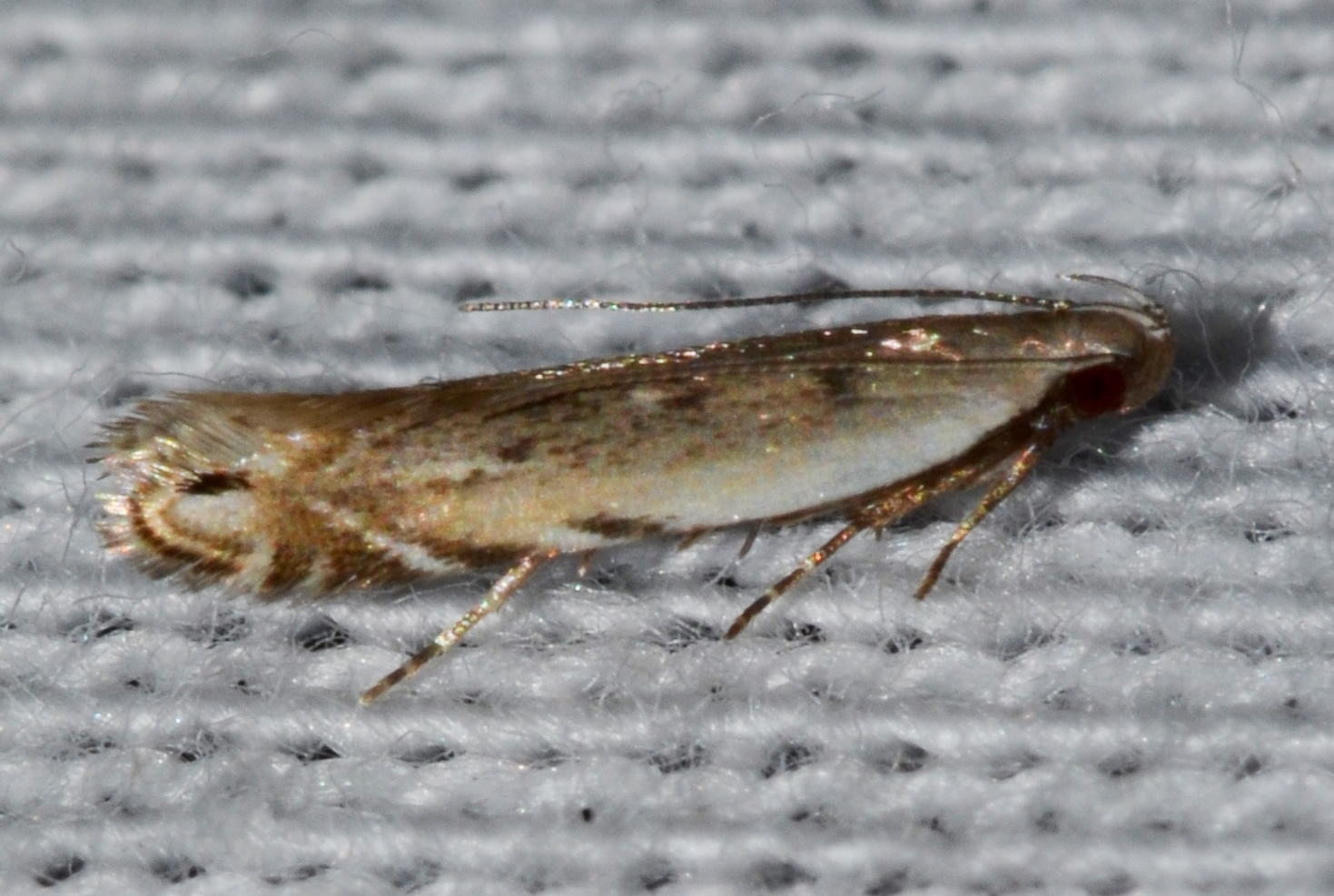

Scientific classification
- Kingdom: Animalia
- Phylum: Arthropoda
- Clade: Pancrustacea
- Class: Insecta
- Order: Lepidoptera
- Family: Gelechiidae
- Genus: Battaristis
- Species: B. nigratomella

Binomial name
- Battaristis nigratomella (Clemens, 1863)

Synonyms
- Gelechia nigratomella Clemens, 1863; Gelechia apicilineella Clemens, 1863; Parasia apicistrigella Chambers, 1872

= Battaristis nigratomella =

Species of moth

Battaristis nigratomella is a species of moth in the family Gelechiidae. It is found in North America, where it has been recorded from Alabama, Arizona, Arkansas, Florida, Georgia, Illinois, Indiana, Kentucky, Louisiana, Maine, Massachusetts, Minnesota, Mississippi, North Carolina, Ohio, Oklahoma, Quebec, South Carolina, Tennessee, Texas, Washington and West Virginia.

The forewings are shining white, but the apical portion is pale brown, containing an oblique white streak. The streak is margined by dark brown on the costa. There is a small black spot beneath the tip. The hindwings are a little darker than the forewings. Adults have been recorded on wing from March to October.
