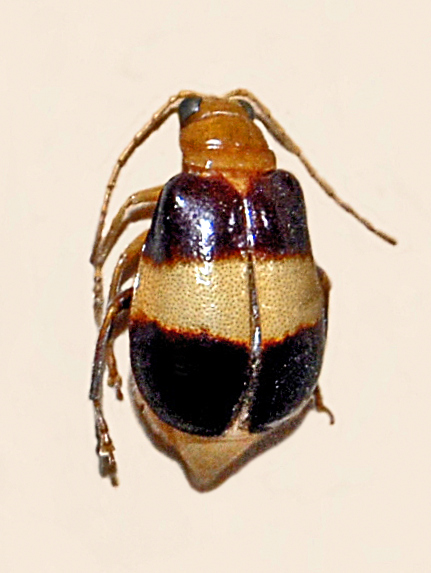
- Aulacophora dorsalis from New Guinea

Scientific classification
- Kingdom: Animalia
- Phylum: Arthropoda
- Clade: Pancrustacea
- Class: Insecta
- Order: Coleoptera
- Suborder: Polyphaga
- Infraorder: Cucujiformia
- Family: Chrysomelidae
- Genus: Aulacophora
- Species: A. dorsalis

Binomial name
- Aulacophora dorsalis (Boisduval, 1835)

= Aulacophora dorsalis =

Species of beetle

Aulacophora dorsalis is a species of beetles in the family Chrysomelidae.

== Description ==
Aulacophora dorsalis can reach a length of about 6–8 millimetres (0.24–0.31 in). The basic color of these beetles is yellowish, with two black transversal bars at the top and bottom of the elytra.

== Distribution ==
This species is native to Southeast Asia.

== Diet ==
This beetle feeds on cucumbers but will also feed on other crops planted near cucumbers, such as leaves of chili plants.
