= Battaristis bistrigella =

Scientific classification
- Domain: Eukaryota
- Kingdom: Animalia
- Phylum: Arthropoda
- Class: Insecta
- Order: Lepidoptera
- Family: Gelechiidae
- Genus: Battaristis
- Species: B. bistrigella

Binomial name
- Battaristis bistrigella (Busck, 1914)

Synonyms
- Anacampsis bistrigella Busck, 1914

Species of moth

Battaristis bistrigella is a moth of the family Gelechiidae. It was described by August Busck in 1914. It is found in Panama.

The wingspan is 8–9 mm. The forewings are light ochreous fuscous with white and blackish brown markings and the costal edge with three blackish markings, one from the base to the basal fourth with a smaller projection obliquely outward, one an obliquely outwardly directed streak on the middle and the third a large spot covering the apical third of the costal edge but interrupted by a thin, white, transverse, outwardly angulated fascia across the wing at the apical fourth and by two, small, perpendicular streaks beyond this fascia. At the angle of the fascia is a narrow, longitudinal, black streak and the apical edge has a marginal, black streak. The cell and dorsal part of the wing are mottled with several, irregular, small, blackish brown spots. The hindwings are dark fuscous.
