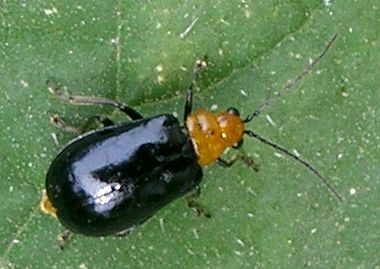

Scientific classification
- Domain: Eukaryota
- Kingdom: Animalia
- Phylum: Arthropoda
- Class: Insecta
- Order: Coleoptera
- Suborder: Polyphaga
- Infraorder: Cucujiformia
- Family: Chrysomelidae
- Genus: Aulacophora
- Species: A. nigripennis

Binomial name
- Aulacophora nigripennis Motschulsky, 1857

= Aulacophora nigripennis =

Species of beetle

Aulacophora nigripennis in Japan flies away.

Aulacophora nigripennis is a species of leaf beetle in the genus Aulacophora.

== Description ==
The beetle is relatively small with a hard, black exoskeleton containing faint yellowish dots around the sides. The head is a deep, bright orange, while A. nigripennis has a large orange compartmentalized thorax.

== Feeding ==
A. nigripennis is a pest that feeds on species of the plant genera Dianthus and Trichosanthes by creating a circular "trench" using its mandibles. After circularly cutting through the leaf, the trench overflows with sticky phloem sap that, through cohesion, sticks to form a semicircle around the beetle. The beetle then sucks the sap using its mouth.

== Biology ==
A. nigripennis stores cucurbitacins from curcurbit plants for use as defense.

== Pest control ==
Researchers in Japan have conducted research in using "trap plants" to kill off and reduce the numbers of A. nigripennis. Because A. nigripennis is attracted particularly to Dianthus pungens in the genus Dianthus, D. pungens trap plants were the most effective, reducing the population of A. nigripennis from 1.5 beetles per 100 carnation plants to a mere 0.1 beetles, a 93.3% reduction.
