= Anaches dorsalis =

Scientific classification
- Domain: Eukaryota
- Kingdom: Animalia
- Phylum: Arthropoda
- Class: Insecta
- Order: Coleoptera
- Suborder: Polyphaga
- Infraorder: Cucujiformia
- Family: Cerambycidae
- Tribe: Pteropliini
- Genus: Anaches
- Species: A. dorsalis

Binomial name
- Anaches dorsalis (Pascoe, 1858)

Synonyms
- Anaches albonotatus Pic, 1932; Pterolophia dorsalis (Pascoe, 1858); Sthenias dorsalis Pascoe, 1858

Species of beetle

Anaches dorsalis is a species of beetle in the family Cerambycidae. It was described by Francis Polkinghorne Pascoe in 1858. It is found in India, Nepal, Bangladesh, China, Thailand, Laos, and Vietnam.

Anaches dorsalis measure 10–14 mm (0.39–0.55 in).
