= Anchomenus aeneolus =

Scientific classification
- Domain: Eukaryota
- Kingdom: Animalia
- Phylum: Arthropoda
- Class: Insecta
- Order: Coleoptera
- Suborder: Adephaga
- Family: Carabidae
- Genus: Anchomenus
- Species: A. aeneolus

Binomial name
- Anchomenus aeneolus (LeConte, 1854)

Synonyms
- Platynus aeneolus LeConte, 1854b; Agonum bjorkmanae Gray & Hatch, 1941; Anchomenus metuens Casey, 1920; Anchomenus dilleyanus Casey, 1920

Species of beetle

Anchomenus aeneolus is a species of beetle in the family Carabidae. It is found in Alberta and British Columbia, Canada and the U.S. states such as Idaho, Montana, Oregon, and Washington.
