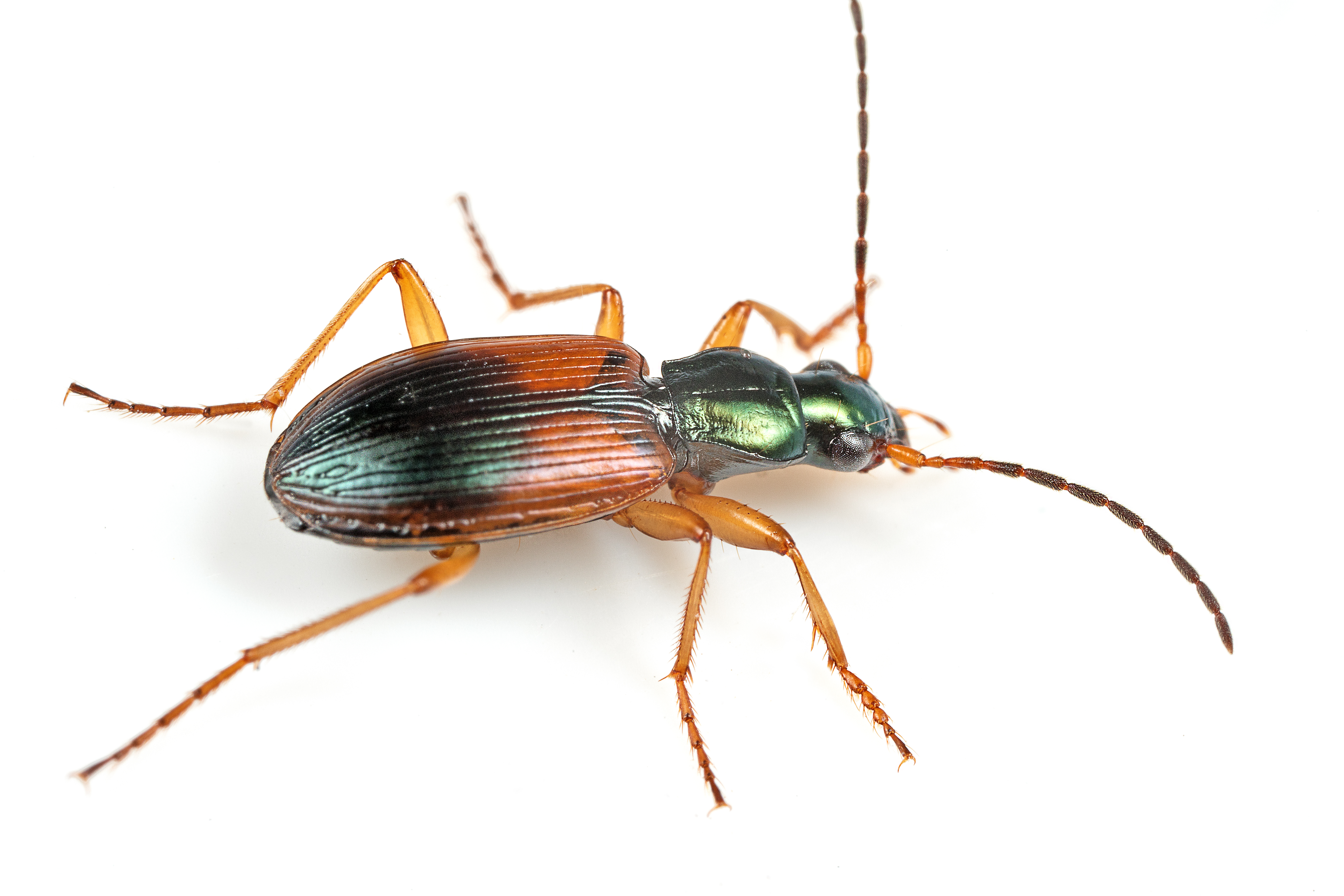

Scientific classification
- Kingdom: Animalia
- Phylum: Arthropoda
- Clade: Pancrustacea
- Class: Insecta
- Order: Coleoptera
- Suborder: Adephaga
- Family: Carabidae
- Genus: Anchomenus
- Species: A. dorsalis

Binomial name
- Anchomenus dorsalis (Pontoppidan, 1763)

Synonyms
- Carabus dorsalis Pontoppidan, 1763; Agonum dorsale; Anchomenus viridifulvus (Goeze, 1777); Anchomenus marchicus (Herbst, 1784); Anchomenus prasinus (Thunberg, 1784); Anchomenus violaceus (Thunberg, 1784) (preocc.); Anchomenus bicolor (Geoffroy In Fourcroy, 1785); Anchomenus viridanus (Fabricius, 1787); Anchomenus thunbergi (Gmelin, 1790); Anchomenus viridis (Gmelin, 1790); Anchomenus cyanicollis Gebler, 1841; Anchomenus discophorus Chaudoir, 1842; Anchomenus bicolor Letzner, 1851; Anchomenus coeruleoviridis Letzner, 1851; Anchomenus quinquepunctatus Letzner, 1851; Anchomenus rufipennis Letzner, 1851; Anchomenus submaculatus Letzner, 1851; Anchomenus suturalis Letzner, 1851; Anchomenus infuscatus Chevrolat, 1854; Anchomenus moleki (Rambousek, 1907); Anchomenus malyi (Obenberger, 1914); Anchomenus maroccanus (Antoine, 1941); Anchomenus rufothoracicus (Krejcarek, 1947)

= Anchomenus dorsalis =

Species of beetle

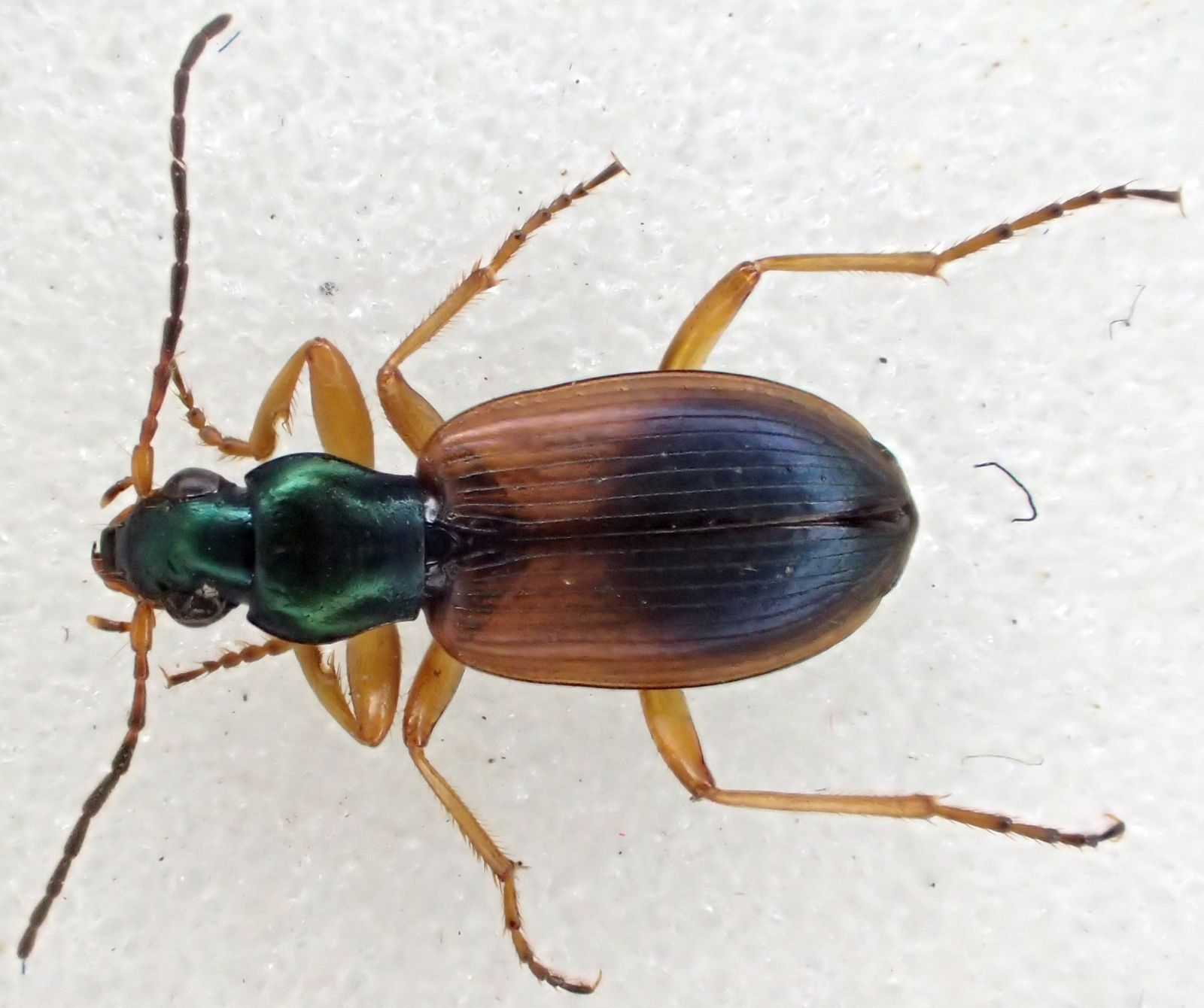

Anchomenus dorsalis is a species of ground beetle in the subfamily Platyninae. It is found in Europe, North Africa, West and Central Asia.

== Description ==
This beetle is bright green-blue and red-brown in color. The adults are 5.6–7.7 mm long, with females larger than males.

== Biology ==
This beetle forms aggregations of several individuals, often with beetles of the genus Brachinus. When disturbed it releases a volatile that contains undecane. Its coloration may be aposematic mimicry of the similarly colored Brachinus beetles it lives with, which emit a much more powerful antipredator volatile mix.
