= Abacetus aeneolus =

Scientific classification
- Domain: Eukaryota
- Kingdom: Animalia
- Phylum: Arthropoda
- Class: Insecta
- Order: Coleoptera
- Suborder: Adephaga
- Family: Carabidae
- Genus: Abacetus
- Species: A. aeneolus

Binomial name
- Abacetus aeneolus Chaudoir, 1869

Species of beetle

Abacetus aeneolus is a species of ground beetle in the subfamily Pterostichinae. It was described by Chaudoir in 1869 and is an endemic species found in Namibia.
