= Battaristis emissurella =

Scientific classification
- Kingdom: Animalia
- Phylum: Arthropoda
- Class: Insecta
- Order: Lepidoptera
- Family: Gelechiidae
- Genus: Battaristis
- Species: B. emissurella

Binomial name
- Battaristis emissurella (Walker, 1864)

Synonyms
- Gelechia emissurella Walker, 1864; Cryptolechia severella Walker, 1864; Lecithocera brunniceps Felder & Rogenhofer, 1875; Gelechia fuliginosa Felder & Rogenhofer, 1875; Anacampsis dorsalis Busck, 1914; Compsolechia astroconis Meyrick, 1918

Species of moth

Battaristis emissurella is a moth of the family Gelechiidae. It was described by Francis Walker in 1864. It is found in Panama, Colombia, Suriname, Guyana and Brazil.

The wingspan is about 16 mm. The forewings are pale ochreous with the extreme costal edge dark fuscous, on the posterior half forming a gradually dilated streak almost to the apex. There is a dark fuscous patch occupying the dorsal three-fifths of the wing from near the base to two-thirds. A strongly excurved fine whitish line is found from three-fourths of the costa to the tornus, edged anteriorly except on the costal streak, by a grey fascia strewn with shining white specks. The terminal space beyond this is white on the upper half with two fine black dashes and a dark fuscous marginal line, suffusedly marked with dark fuscous on the lower half. The hindwings are dark grey.
