= A. guttiger =

A. guttiger may refer to:

- Abacetus guttiger, a ground beetle
- Acupalpus guttiger, a ground beetle found in the east Palearctic
