= Abacops =

Scientific classification
- Kingdom: Animalia
- Phylum: Arthropoda
- Class: Insecta
- Order: Coleoptera
- Suborder: Adephaga
- Family: Carabidae
- Subtribe: Molopina
- Genus: Abacops; Tschitscherine, 1902

Type species
- Feronia (Abax) rugipennis Dejean, 1828

Synonyms
- Species: Platysma (Abacops) rugipenne (Dejean, 1828)

Genus of beetles

Abacops is a genus of beetle in the family Carabidae; its only species is Abacops rugipennis.
