= Acupalpus hilaris =

Scientific classification
- Kingdom: Animalia
- Phylum: Arthropoda
- Clade: Pancrustacea
- Class: Insecta
- Order: Coleoptera
- Suborder: Adephaga
- Family: Carabidae
- Subfamily: Harpalinae
- Tribe: Harpalini
- Subtribe: Stenolophina
- Genus: Acupalpus
- Species: A. hilaris

Binomial name
- Acupalpus hilaris Tschitscherine, 1899

Species of beetle

Acupalpus hilaris is a species in the beetle family Carabidae. It is found in South Korea, Japan, and Russia, and was first described in 1899 by Tikhon Chicherin.
