= Bothynoproctus =

Bothynoproctus mattoensis

Scientific classification
- Kingdom: Animalia
- Phylum: Arthropoda
- Class: Insecta
- Order: Coleoptera
- Suborder: Adephaga
- Family: Carabidae
- Subfamily: Pterostichinae
- Genus: Bothynoproctus; Tschitscherine, 1900
- Species: B. mattoensis

Binomial name
- Bothynoproctus mattoensis Tschitscherine, 1900

Genus of beetles

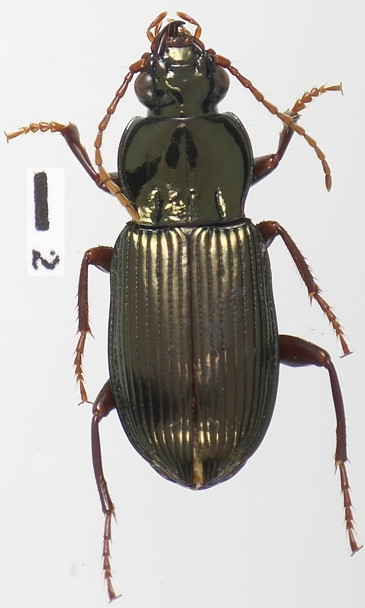
A closeup view of Bothynoproctus

Bothynoproctus mattoensis is a species of beetle in the family Carabidae. Described by Tschitscherine in 1900, it is the only species in the genus Bothynoproctus.
