= Acupalpus egenus =

Scientific classification
- Kingdom: Animalia
- Phylum: Arthropoda
- Class: Insecta
- Order: Coleoptera
- Suborder: Adephaga
- Family: Carabidae
- Genus: Acupalpus
- Species: A. egenus

Binomial name
- Acupalpus egenus Péringuey, 1896

Species of beetle

Acupalpus egenus is a ground beetle of the genus Acupalpus. They are small, only 4 mm long, and found in South Africa. They are very hard to differentiate from Acupalpus dubius.
