= Stenolophidius =

Former genus of beetles

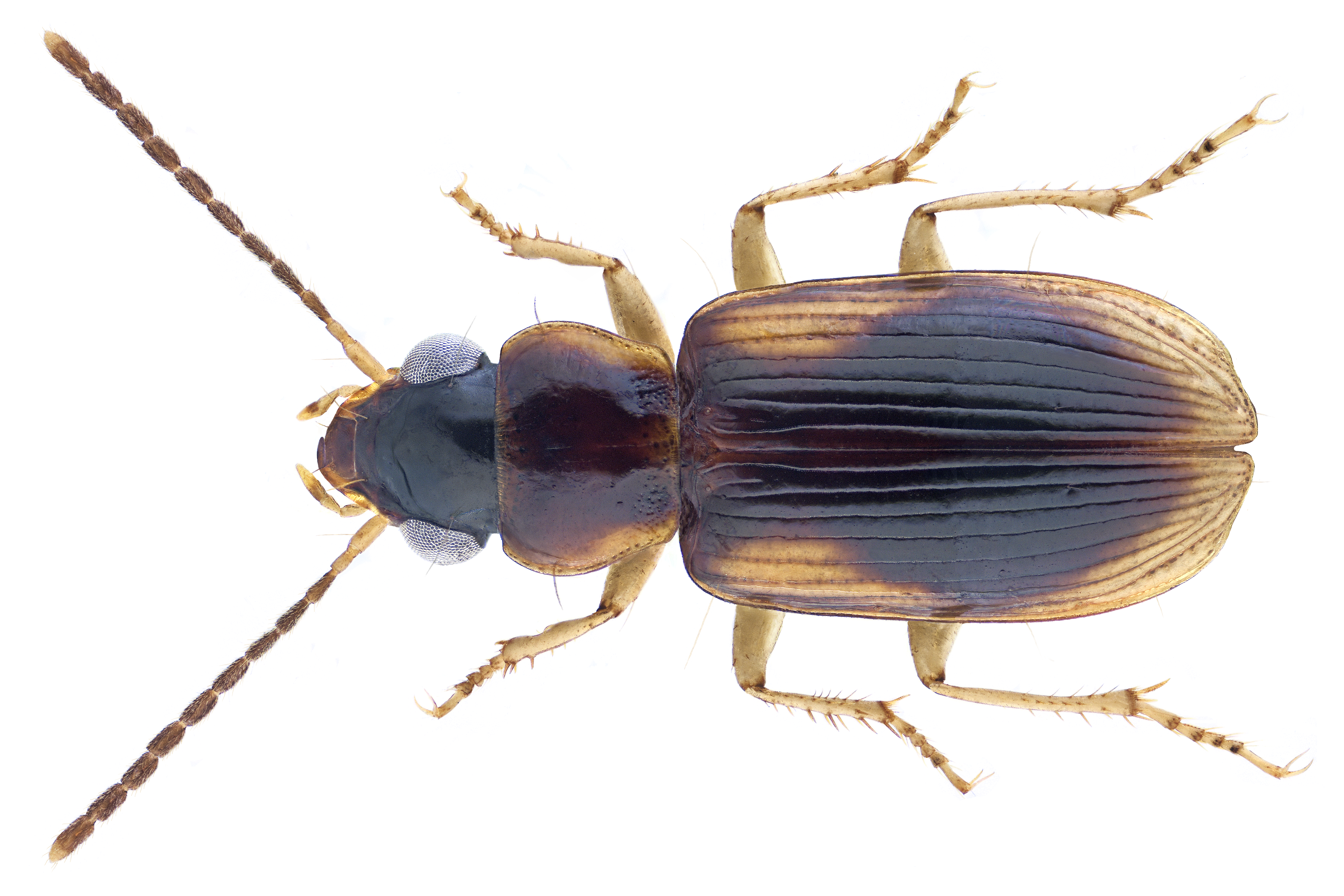
Acupalpus (Stenolophidius) posticalis

Stenolophidius was a genus of beetles in the family Carabidae, but is now considered a subgenus of the genus Acupalpus Latreille, 1829.
