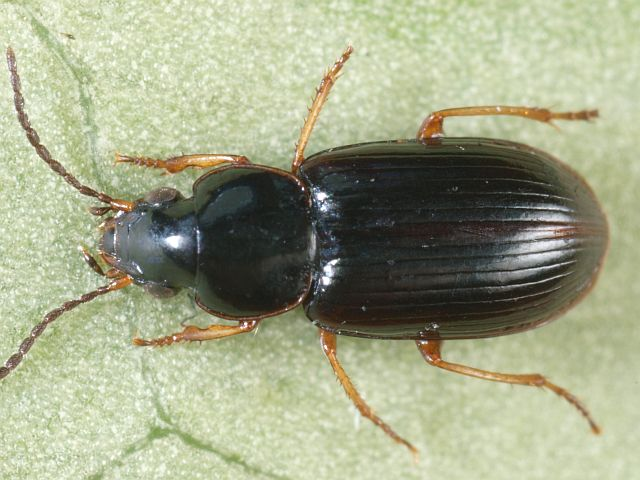

Scientific classification
- Domain: Eukaryota
- Kingdom: Animalia
- Phylum: Arthropoda
- Class: Insecta
- Order: Coleoptera
- Suborder: Adephaga
- Family: Carabidae
- Subfamily: Harpalinae
- Tribe: Harpalini
- Genus: Acupalpus
- Species: A. brunnipes

Binomial name
- Acupalpus brunnipes (Sturm, 1825)

= Acupalpus brunnipes =

Species of beetle

Acupalpus brunnipes is a ground beetle in the family Carabidae, found in the Palearctic, in northern and western Europe, Greece, and North Africa. It typically lives among moss and litter near water. Like most ground beetles, Acupalpus brunnipes is a predator.
