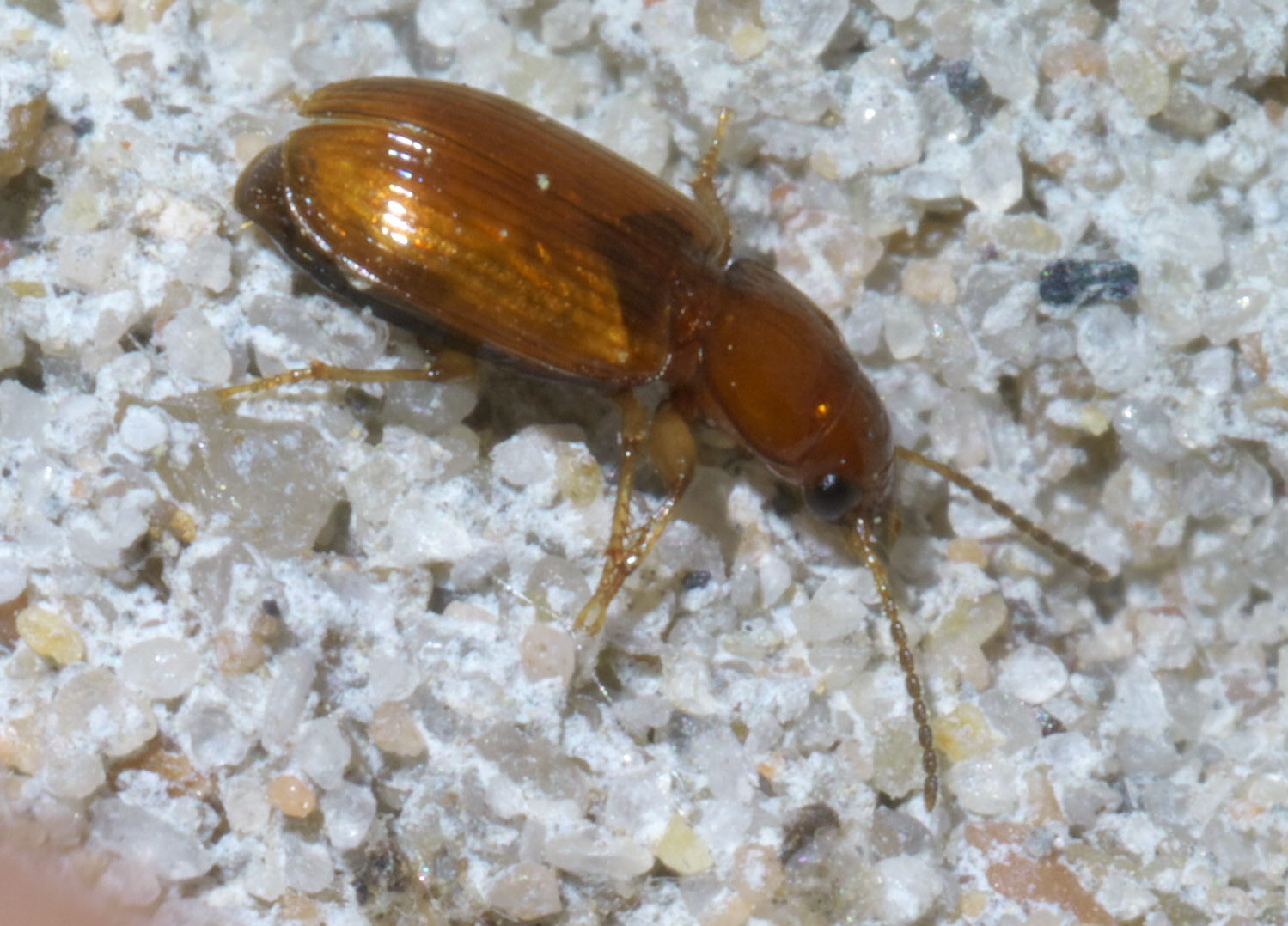

Scientific classification
- Kingdom: Animalia
- Phylum: Arthropoda
- Class: Insecta
- Order: Coleoptera
- Suborder: Adephaga
- Family: Carabidae
- Genus: Acupalpus
- Species: A. testaceus

Binomial name
- Acupalpus testaceus Dejean, 1829

= Acupalpus testaceus =

Species of beetle

Acupalpus testaceus is a species of ground beetle in the family Carabidae. It is found in North America.

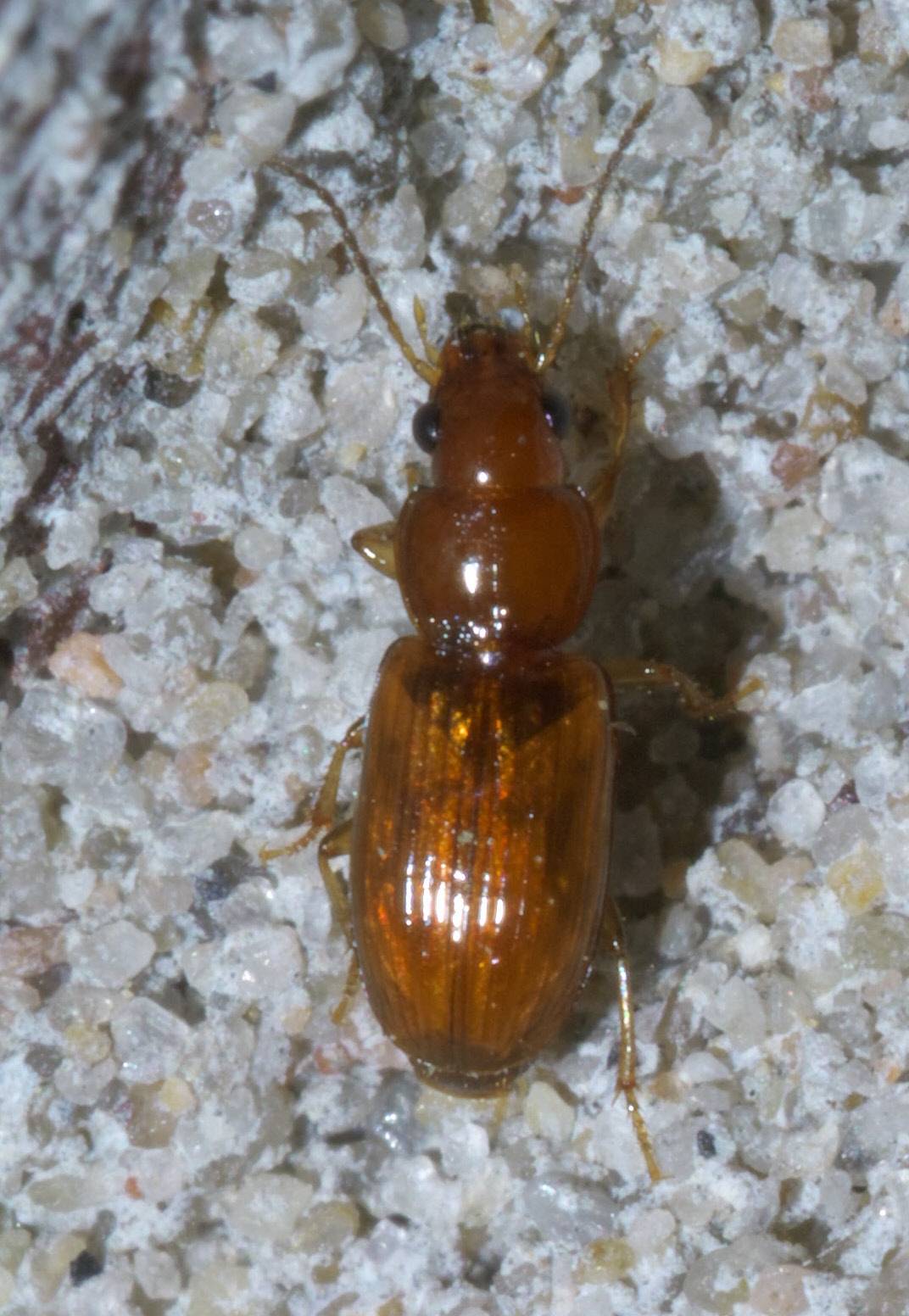
