= Acupalpus alluaudianus =

Scientific classification
- Domain: Eukaryota
- Kingdom: Animalia
- Phylum: Arthropoda
- Class: Insecta
- Order: Coleoptera
- Suborder: Adephaga
- Family: Carabidae
- Subfamily: Harpalinae
- Tribe: Harpalini
- Genus: Acupalpus
- Species: A. alluaudianus

Binomial name
- Acupalpus alluaudianus Lorenz, 1998

Species of beetle

Acupalpus alluaudianus is an insect-eating beetle of the genus Acupalpus.
