= Acupalpus partiarius =

Scientific classification
- Kingdom: Animalia
- Phylum: Arthropoda
- Clade: Pancrustacea
- Class: Insecta
- Order: Coleoptera
- Suborder: Adephaga
- Family: Carabidae
- Genus: Acupalpus
- Species: A. partiarius

Binomial name
- Acupalpus partiarius (Say, 1823)

Species of beetle

Acupalpus partiarius is a species of ground beetles in the family Carabidae. It is found in North America.
