= Acupalpus inornatus =

Scientific classification
- Kingdom: Animalia
- Phylum: Arthropoda
- Clade: Pancrustacea
- Class: Insecta
- Order: Coleoptera
- Suborder: Adephaga
- Family: Carabidae
- Subfamily: Harpalinae
- Tribe: Harpalini
- Subtribe: Stenolophina
- Genus: Acupalpus
- Species: A. inornatus

Binomial name
- Acupalpus inornatus Bates, 1873

Species of beetle

Acupalpus inornatus is a species in the beetle family Carabidae. It is found in China, North Korea, South Korea, Japan, Taiwan, and Russia. It was first described in 1873 by Henry Walter Bates.
