= Acupalpus nanellus =

Scientific classification
- Kingdom: Animalia
- Phylum: Arthropoda
- Class: Insecta
- Order: Coleoptera
- Suborder: Adephaga
- Family: Carabidae
- Genus: Acupalpus
- Species: A. nanellus

Binomial name
- Acupalpus nanellus Casey, 1914

Species of beetle

Acupalpus nanellus is a species of ground beetle in the family Carabidae. It is found in North America.
