= Acupalpus ibericus =

Scientific classification
- Kingdom: Animalia
- Phylum: Arthropoda
- Clade: Pancrustacea
- Class: Insecta
- Order: Coleoptera
- Suborder: Adephaga
- Family: Carabidae
- Genus: Acupalpus
- Species: A. ibericus

Binomial name
- Acupalpus ibericus Jaeger, 1988

Species of beetle

Acupalpus ibericus is an insect-eating ground beetle of the Acupalpus genus.
