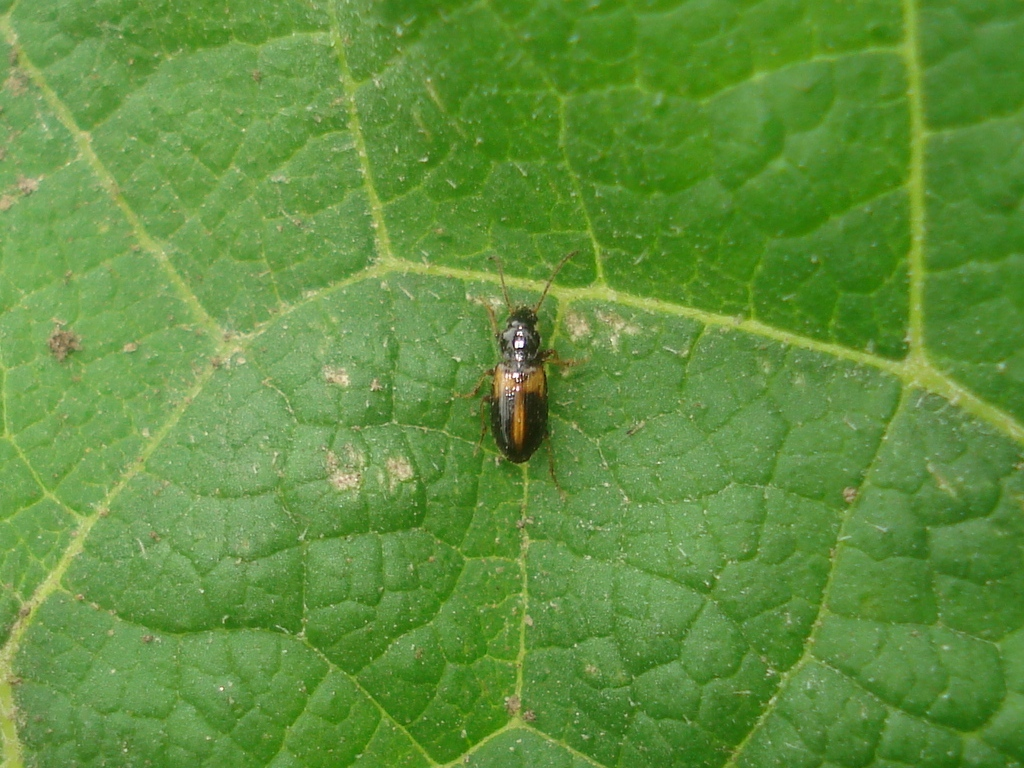

Scientific classification
- Domain: Eukaryota
- Kingdom: Animalia
- Phylum: Arthropoda
- Class: Insecta
- Order: Coleoptera
- Suborder: Adephaga
- Family: Carabidae
- Subfamily: Harpalinae
- Tribe: Harpalini
- Genus: Acupalpus
- Species: A. meridianus

Binomial name
- Acupalpus meridianus (Linnaeus, 1760)

= Acupalpus meridianus =

Species of beetle

Acupalpus meridianus is an insect-eating ground beetle of the genus Acupalpus found in western Canada. Until 1988, it was only identified in the southern portion of Vancouver Island, but has since spread as far west as Edmonton.
