= Acupalpus hydropicus =

Scientific classification
- Domain: Eukaryota
- Kingdom: Animalia
- Phylum: Arthropoda
- Class: Insecta
- Order: Coleoptera
- Suborder: Adephaga
- Family: Carabidae
- Subfamily: Harpalinae
- Tribe: Harpalini
- Genus: Acupalpus
- Species: A. hydropicus

Binomial name
- Acupalpus hydropicus Leconte, 1863

Species of beetle

Acupalpus hydropicus is an insect-eating ground beetle of the Acupalpus genus.
