= Acupalpus cantabricus =

Scientific classification
- Kingdom: Animalia
- Phylum: Arthropoda
- Clade: Pancrustacea
- Class: Insecta
- Order: Coleoptera
- Suborder: Adephaga
- Family: Carabidae
- Genus: Acupalpus
- Species: A. cantabricus

Binomial name
- Acupalpus cantabricus (Piochard de la Brûlerie 1868)

Species of beetle

Acupalpus cantabricus is an insect-eating ground beetle of the Acupalpus genus.
