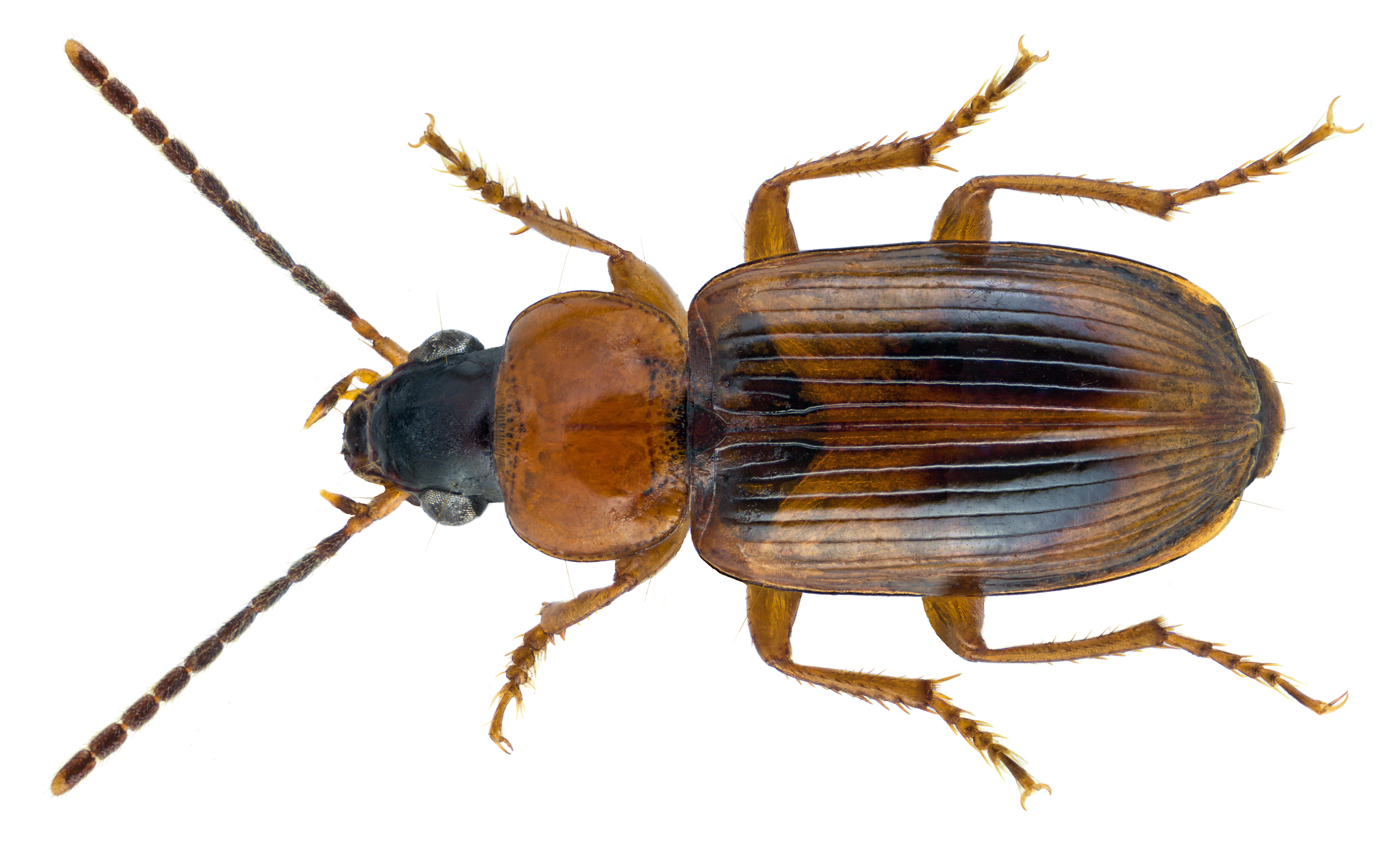

Scientific classification
- Domain: Eukaryota
- Kingdom: Animalia
- Phylum: Arthropoda
- Class: Insecta
- Order: Coleoptera
- Suborder: Adephaga
- Family: Carabidae
- Subfamily: Harpalinae
- Tribe: Harpalini
- Genus: Acupalpus
- Species: A. elegans

Binomial name
- Acupalpus elegans (Dejean 1829)

= Acupalpus elegans =

Species of beetle

Acupalpus elegans is an insect-eating ground beetle in the genus Acupalpus. It is found on the Canary Islands, Europe, the Middle East, Middle Asia and West Siberia. The species is halophilic and prefers salt marsh habitats.
