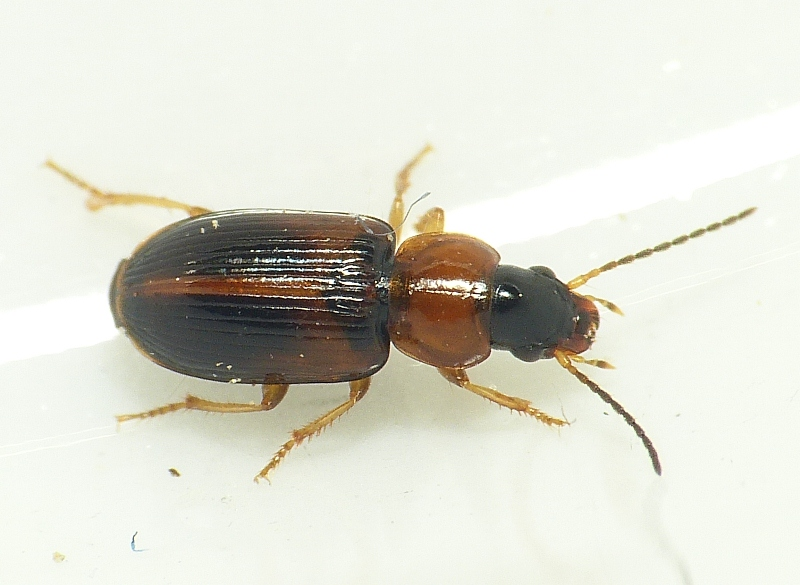

Scientific classification
- Domain: Eukaryota
- Kingdom: Animalia
- Phylum: Arthropoda
- Class: Insecta
- Order: Coleoptera
- Suborder: Adephaga
- Family: Carabidae
- Subfamily: Harpalinae
- Tribe: Harpalini
- Genus: Acupalpus
- Species: A. flavicollis

Binomial name
- Acupalpus flavicollis (Sturm, 1825)

= Acupalpus flavicollis =

Species of beetle

Acupalpus flavicollis is a Palearctic species of ground beetle in the family Carabidae.

== Description ==
=== General morphology ===
Acupalpus flavicollis is between 2.9 mm and 3.7 mm long.

== Distribution ==
This palaearctic species is present in many countries and from west to East ranges from the United Kingdom to Easter Russia. From Sweden and North European Russia in the North to Italy, Greece and even the Azores Islands in the South.

== Ecology ==
In western Europe, the species seems to only be found in restored areas.

=== Habitat ===
A. flavicollis is found in swamps, marshes and near river banks.
