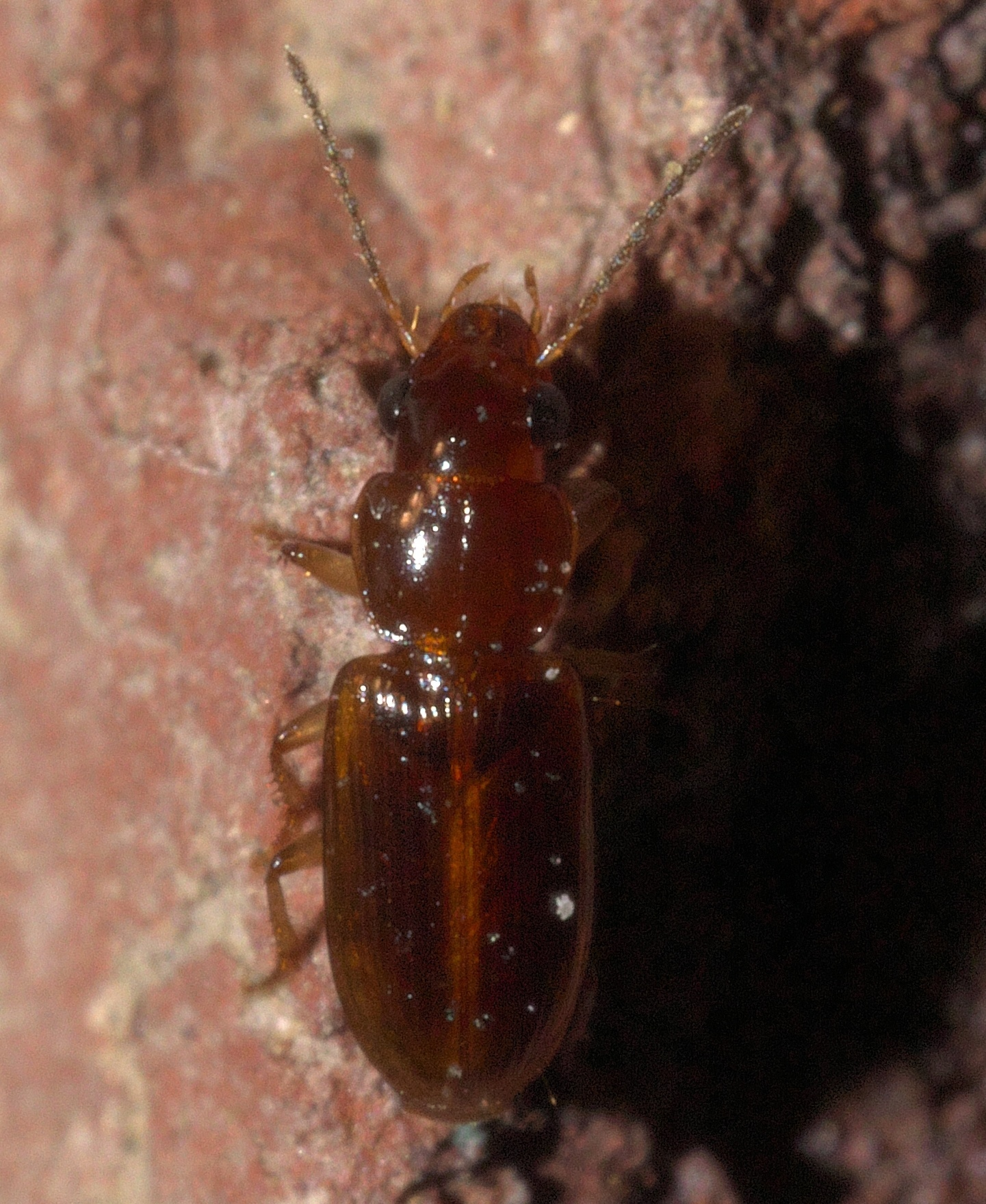
- Acupalpus indistinctus, Oklahoma

Scientific classification
- Kingdom: Animalia
- Phylum: Arthropoda
- Class: Insecta
- Order: Coleoptera
- Suborder: Adephaga
- Family: Carabidae
- Tribe: Harpalini
- Genus: Acupalpus
- Species: A. indistinctus

Binomial name
- Acupalpus indistinctus Dejean, 1831

= Acupalpus indistinctus =

Species of beetle

Acupalpus indistinctus is an insect-eating ground beetle of the genus Acupalpus, found in North America. The species was first described by Dejean in 1831.
