= Acupalpus dimidiatus =

Scientific classification
- Kingdom: Animalia
- Phylum: Arthropoda
- Clade: Pancrustacea
- Class: Insecta
- Order: Coleoptera
- Suborder: Adephaga
- Family: Carabidae
- Genus: Acupalpus
- Species: A. dimidiatus

Binomial name
- Acupalpus dimidiatus Brullé, 1838

Species of beetle

Acupalpus dimidiatus is an insect-eating ground beetle of the genus Acupalpus.
