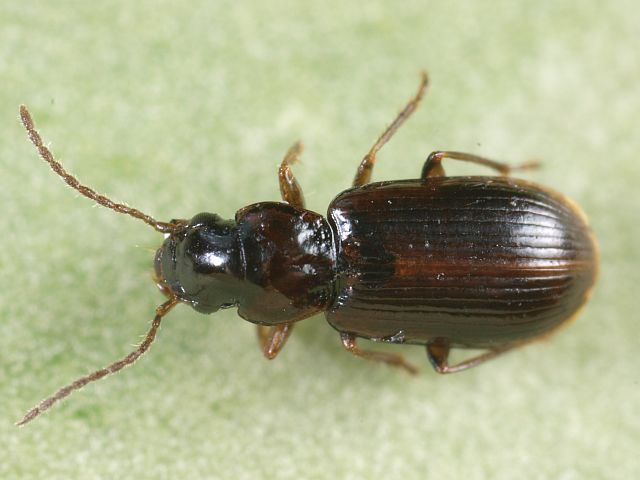

Scientific classification
- Kingdom: Animalia
- Phylum: Arthropoda
- Class: Insecta
- Order: Coleoptera
- Suborder: Adephaga
- Family: Carabidae
- Tribe: Harpalini
- Genus: Acupalpus
- Species: A. exiguus

Binomial name
- Acupalpus exiguus Dejean, 1829

= Acupalpus exiguus =

Species of beetle

Acupalpus exiguus is a species of ground beetle in the family Carabidae, found in the Palearctic.
