= Acupalpus gracilis =

Scientific classification
- Kingdom: Animalia
- Phylum: Arthropoda
- Clade: Pancrustacea
- Class: Insecta
- Order: Coleoptera
- Suborder: Adephaga
- Family: Carabidae
- Genus: Acupalpus
- Species: A. gracilis

Binomial name
- Acupalpus gracilis Boheman, 1848

Species of beetle

Acupalpus gracilis is an insect-eating ground beetle of the genus Acupalpus.
