= Acupalpus alumnus =

Scientific classification
- Domain: Eukaryota
- Kingdom: Animalia
- Phylum: Arthropoda
- Class: Insecta
- Order: Coleoptera
- Suborder: Adephaga
- Family: Carabidae
- Subfamily: Harpalinae
- Tribe: Harpalini
- Genus: Acupalpus
- Species: A. alumnus

Binomial name
- Acupalpus alumnus Basilewsky, 1946

Species of beetle

Acupalpus alumnus is an insect-eating ground beetle of the genus Acupalpus.
