= Acupalpus carus =

Scientific classification
- Domain: Eukaryota
- Kingdom: Animalia
- Phylum: Arthropoda
- Class: Insecta
- Order: Coleoptera
- Suborder: Adephaga
- Family: Carabidae
- Subfamily: Harpalinae
- Tribe: Harpalini
- Genus: Acupalpus
- Species: A. carus

Binomial name
- Acupalpus carus (LeConte, 1863)

Species of beetle

Acupalpus carus is a black coloured insect-eating ground beetle of the Acupalpus genus which can be found in Canada and the United States.
