= Acupalpus brunnicolor =

Scientific classification
- Kingdom: Animalia
- Phylum: Arthropoda
- Class: Insecta
- Order: Coleoptera
- Suborder: Adephaga
- Family: Carabidae
- Genus: Acupalpus
- Species: A. brunnicolor

Binomial name
- Acupalpus brunnicolor (Sloane 1898)

Species of beetle

Acupalpus brunnicolor is an insect-eating ground beetle of the Acupalpus genus. It is the only Acupalpus species found in Australia, where its range is from Queensland, the Northern Territory, and Western Australia. It is an omnivorous, seed-eating insect with a length of 3–4 mm.
