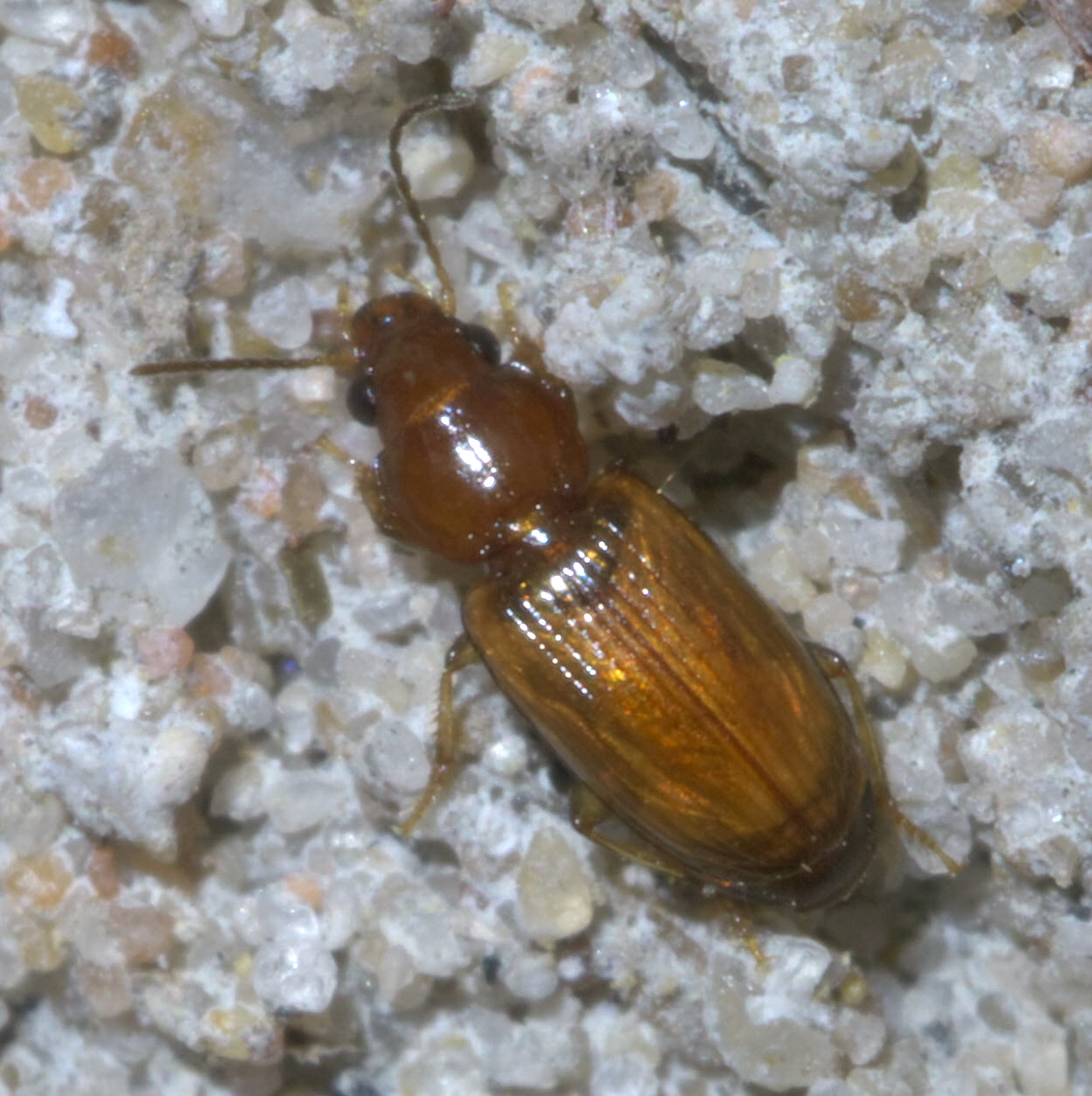
- Acupalpus testaceus, Oklahoma

Scientific classification
- Kingdom: Animalia
- Phylum: Arthropoda
- Class: Insecta
- Order: Coleoptera
- Suborder: Adephaga
- Family: Carabidae
- Tribe: Harpalini
- Subtribe: Stenolophina
- Genus: Acupalpus; Latreille, 1829

= Acupalpus =

Genus of beetles

Acupalpus is a genus of insect-eating beetle species. Its representatives are found across Europe, Asia, and North America.

== Species ==
The following species fall within the genus of Acupalpus:

Subgenus Acupalpus

- Species Acupalpus alluaudianus Lorenz, 1998
- Species Acupalpus alumnus Basilewsky, 1946
- Species Acupalpus angulosus Lorenz, 1998
- Species Acupalpus antongilensis Jeannel, 1948
- Species Acupalpus bifossulatus Solier, 1849
- Species Acupalpus brunnipes (Sturm, 1825)
- Species Acupalpus canadensis Casey, 1924
- Species Acupalpus cantabricus (Piochard de la Brûlerie, 1868)
- Species Acupalpus carus (LeConte, 1863)
- Species Acupalpus dimidiatus Brullé, 1838
- Species Acupalpus djemdjemensis Basilewsky, 1948
- Species Acupalpus dubius Schilsky, 1888
- Species Acupalpus egenus Péringuey, 1896
- Species Acupalpus elegans (Dejean, 1829)
- Species Acupalpus erythroderes Blanchard, 1843
- Species Acupalpus exiguus Dejean, 1829
- Species Acupalpus flaviceps (Motschulsky, 1850)
- Species Acupalpus flavicollis (Sturm, 1825)
- Species Acupalpus foveicollis Solier, 1849
- Species Acupalpus gracilis Boheman, 1848
- Species Acupalpus guttiger Schauberger, 1938
- Species Acupalpus hydropicus (LeConte, 1863)
- Species Acupalpus ibericus Jaeger, 1988
- Species Acupalpus inouyei Habu, 1980
- Species Acupalpus insidiosus Péringuey, 1896
- Species Acupalpus iridens (Motschulsky, 1864)
- Species Acupalpus jaegeri Kataev, 1996
- Species Acupalpus kundelunguensis Basilewsky, 1951
- Species Acupalpus laevicollis G.Müller, 1942
- Species Acupalpus laferi Kataev & Jaeger, 1997
- Species Acupalpus latipennis Jeannel, 1948
- Species Acupalpus latiusculus Basilewsky, 1951
- Species Acupalpus leleupi Basilewsky, 1951
- Species Acupalpus limbatus Gebler, 1833
- Species Acupalpus lucasi (Gaubil, 1849)
- Species Acupalpus luteatus (Duftschmid, 1812)
- Species Acupalpus maculatus (Schaum, 1860)
- Species Acupalpus meridianus (Linnaeus, 1760)
- Species Acupalpus micheli Jeannel, 1948
- Species Acupalpus nanellus Casey, 1914
- Species Acupalpus nigronitidus Blanchard, 1843
- Species Acupalpus notatus Mulsant & Rey, 1861
- Species Acupalpus oliveirae Reitter, 1884
- Species Acupalpus omoxanthus Basilewsky, 1949
- Species Acupalpus orszuliki Wrase & Jaeger, 2017
- Species Acupalpus pallidus Solier, 1849
- Species Acupalpus paludicola Reitter, 1884
- Species Acupalpus parelaphus Vinson, 1935
- Species Acupalpus parvulus (Sturm, 1825)
- Species Acupalpus planicollis (Schaum, 1857)
- Species Acupalpus pumilus Lindroth, 1968
- Species Acupalpus puncticollis (Coquerel, 1859)
- Species Acupalpus punduanus Basilewsky, 1946
- Species Acupalpus ruandanus Basilewsky, 1956
- Species Acupalpus schnitteri Jaeger, 1999
- Species Acupalpus silaceus Dejean, 1831
- Species Acupalpus simplex (Péringuey, 1896)
- Species Acupalpus stricticollis Jeannel, 1948
- Species Acupalpus suturalis Dejean, 1829
- Species Acupalpus tachioides (Sloane, 1900)
- Species Acupalpus testaceipes Blanchard, 1843
- Species Acupalpus turcicus Jaeger, 1992
- Species Acupalpus umbripennis Péringuey, 1896
- Species Acupalpus usambaranus Basilewsky, 1951
- Species Acupalpus ussuriensis Lafer, 1989
- Species Acupalpus vadoni Jeannel, 1948
- Species Acupalpus viduus Dejean, 1829
- Species Acupalpus zaerensis Antoine, 1922

Subgenus Ancylostria

- Species Acupalpus interstitialis Reitter, 1884
- Species Acupalpus mediterraneus Csiki, 1932
- Species Acupalpus morulus Reitter, 1884

Subgenus Setacupalpus

- Species Acupalpus hilaris Tschitscherine, 1899
- Species Acupalpus sobosanus Habu, 1954

Subgenus Stenolophidius

- Species Acupalpus alienus Péringuey, 1908
- Species Acupalpus alluaudi (Jeannel, 1948)
- Species Acupalpus andrewesi Jaeger, 2013
- Species Acupalpus bequaerti Burgeon, 1936
- Species Acupalpus boops J.Sahlberg in Reitter, 1900
- Species Acupalpus borkuanus (Bruneau de Miré, 1990)
- Species Acupalpus brunnicolor (Sloane, 1898)
- Species Acupalpus distincticollis Jaeger, 2013
- Species Acupalpus elaphus Alluaud, 1916
- Species Acupalpus hartmanni Jaeger, 2013
- Species Acupalpus hiekei Jaeger, 2013
- Species Acupalpus inornatus Bates, 1873
- Species Acupalpus leleupi (Basilewsky, 1951)
- Species Acupalpus leroyi (Basilewsky, 1951)
- Species Acupalpus maculipennis Jaeger, 2013
- Species Acupalpus papua Darlington, 1968
- Species Acupalpus posticalis Putzeys, 1880
- Species Acupalpus punctatus (Jedlicka, 1936)
- Species Acupalpus quadrisetosus Jaeger, 2015
- Species Acupalpus rhombotus Andrewes, 1936
- Species Acupalpus seydeli (Basilewsky, 1951)
- Species Acupalpus sinuellus Bates, 1892
- Species Acupalpus terminalis (Chaudoir, 1843)
- Species Acupalpus ustus Andrewes, 1930
- Species Acupalpus villiersi (Basilewsky, 1967)

Subgenus Subacupalpus

- Species Acupalpus gerdmuelleri Jaeger, 2010
- Species Acupalpus sikkimensis Andrewes, 1930

Subgenus Tachistodes

- Species Acupalpus indistinctus Dejean, 1831
- Species Acupalpus partiarius (Say, 1823)
- Species Acupalpus pauperculus Dejean, 1829
- Species Acupalpus testaceus Dejean, 1829
