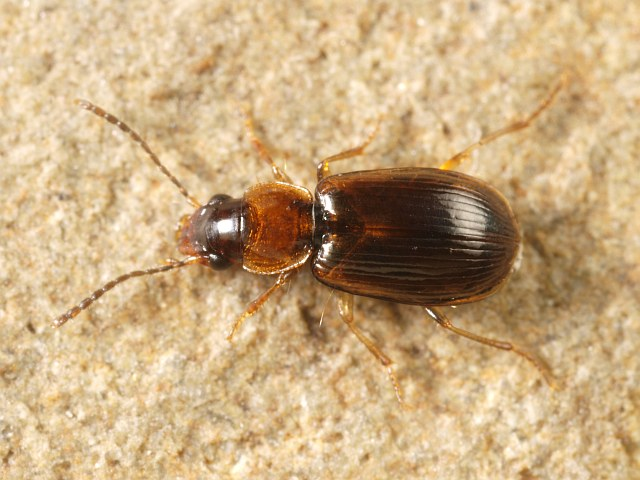
- Acupalpus dubius, location: The Netherlands - Culemborg - Baarsemwaard

Scientific classification
- Kingdom: Animalia
- Phylum: Arthropoda
- Clade: Pancrustacea
- Class: Insecta
- Order: Coleoptera
- Suborder: Adephaga
- Family: Carabidae
- Genus: Acupalpus
- Species: A. dubius

Binomial name
- Acupalpus dubius Schilsky, 1888

= Acupalpus dubius =

Species of beetle

Acupalpus dubius is an insect-eating ground beetle of the Acupalpus genus.
