= Acupalpus guttiger =

Scientific classification
- Domain: Eukaryota
- Kingdom: Animalia
- Phylum: Arthropoda
- Class: Insecta
- Order: Coleoptera
- Suborder: Adephaga
- Family: Carabidae
- Subfamily: Harpalinae
- Tribe: Harpalini
- Genus: Acupalpus
- Species: A. guttiger

Binomial name
- Acupalpus guttiger Schauberger, 1938

Species of beetle

Acupalpus guttiger is an insect-eating ground beetle of the Acupalpus genus. These Beetles can be found in East Palaearctic.
