= Tikhon Chicherin =

Russian entomologist

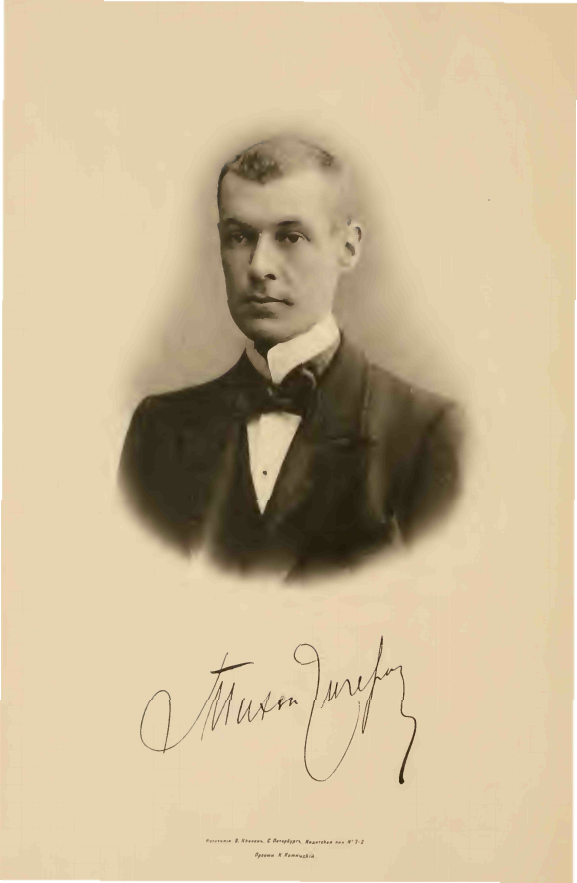
Portrait

Tikhon Sergeyevich Chicherin (Russian: Ти́хон Серге́евич Чиче́рин, French: Tikhon Sergeyevich Tschitscherine; 1869–1904) was a Russian entomologist who specialised in Coleoptera, especially Carabidae.
