= A. foveolatus =

A. foveolatus may refer to:

- Abacetus foveolatus, a ground beetle
- Acanthomyrmex foveolatus, an ant found in Indonesia
- Aspergillus foveolatus, a fungus
