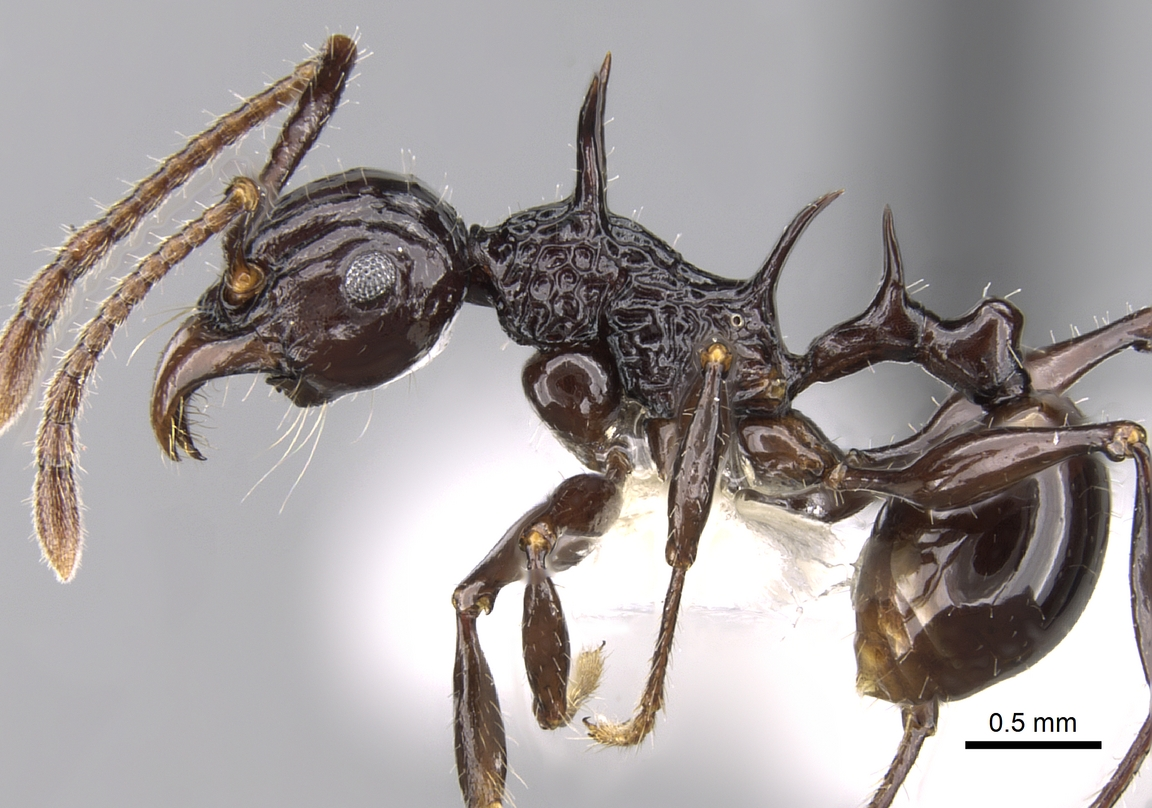

Scientific classification
- Domain: Eukaryota
- Kingdom: Animalia
- Phylum: Arthropoda
- Class: Insecta
- Order: Hymenoptera
- Family: Formicidae
- Subfamily: Myrmicinae
- Genus: Acanthomyrmex
- Species: A. laevis

Binomial name
- Acanthomyrmex laevis Moffett, 1986

= Acanthomyrmex laevis =

Species of ant

Acanthomyrmex laevis is a species of ant that belongs to the genus Acanthomyrmex. It was described by Moffett in 1986, and is abundant in Malaysia.
