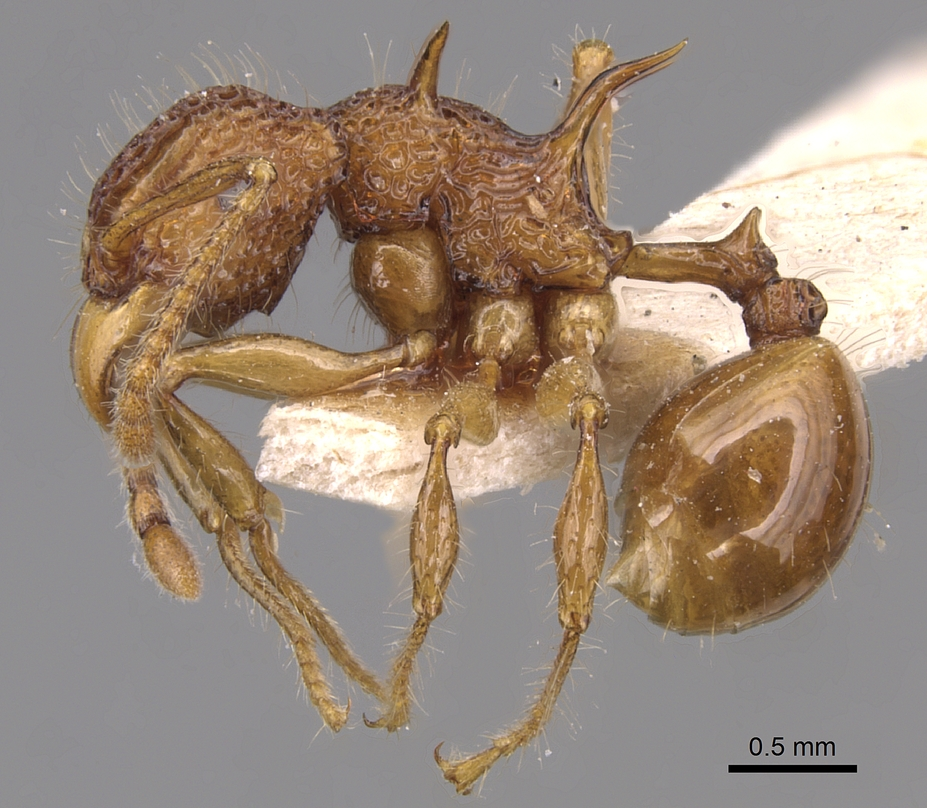

Scientific classification
- Kingdom: Animalia
- Phylum: Arthropoda
- Clade: Pancrustacea
- Class: Insecta
- Order: Hymenoptera
- Family: Formicidae
- Subfamily: Myrmicinae
- Genus: Acanthomyrmex
- Species: A. luciolae

Binomial name
- Acanthomyrmex luciolae Emery, 1893

= Acanthomyrmex luciolae =

Species of ant

Acanthomyrmex luciolae is a species of ant that belongs to the genus Acanthomyrmex. It was described by Emery in 1893, and is abundant in Sri Lanka and China.
