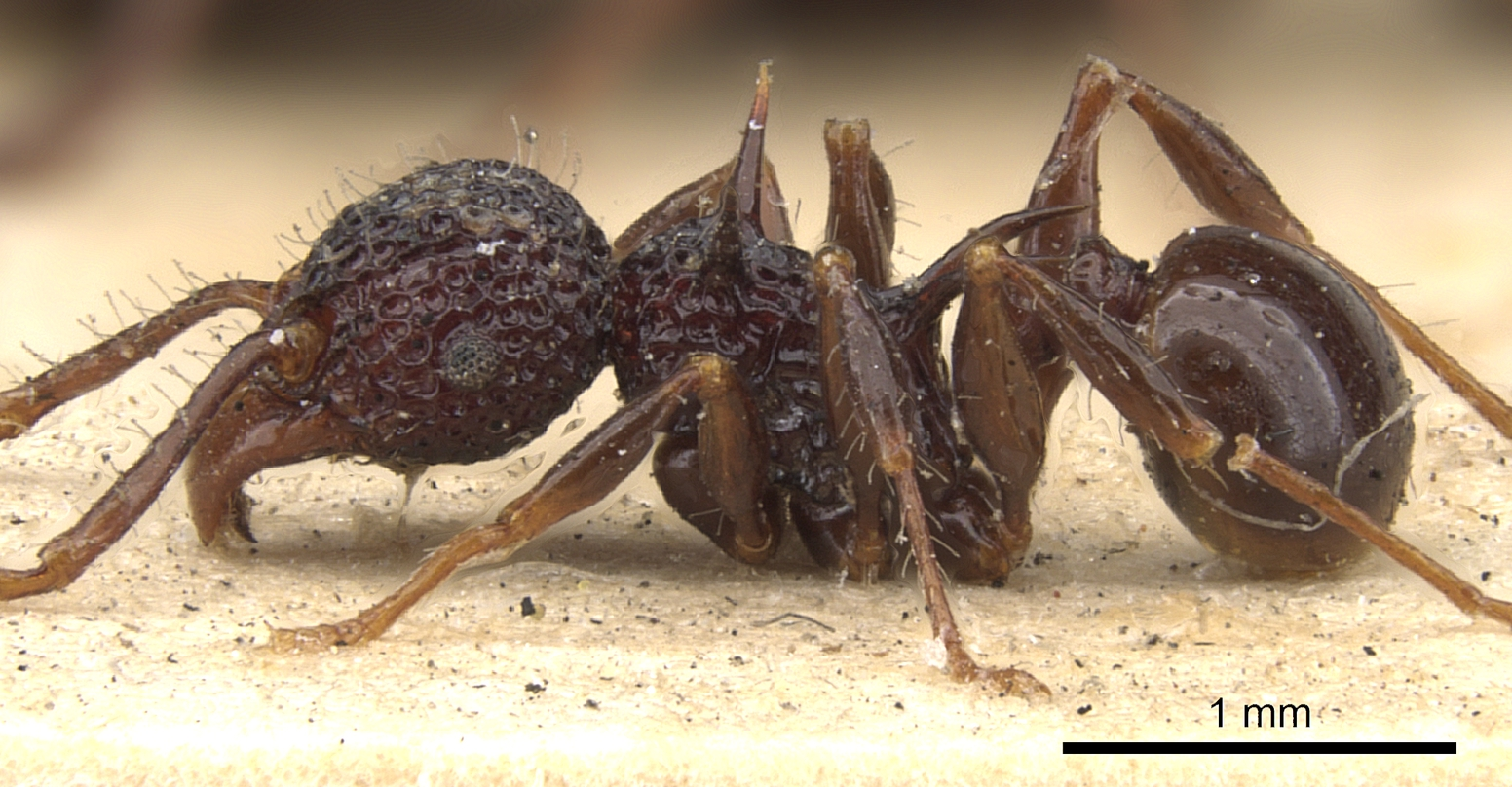

Scientific classification
- Domain: Eukaryota
- Kingdom: Animalia
- Phylum: Arthropoda
- Class: Insecta
- Order: Hymenoptera
- Family: Formicidae
- Subfamily: Myrmicinae
- Genus: Acanthomyrmex
- Species: A. notabilis

Binomial name
- Acanthomyrmex notabilis (Smith, F., 1860)

= Acanthomyrmex notabilis =

Species of ant

Acanthomyrmex notabilis is a species of ant which is a part of the genus Acanthomyrmex. Frederick Smith first described the species in 1860, and it is native to Indonesia.
