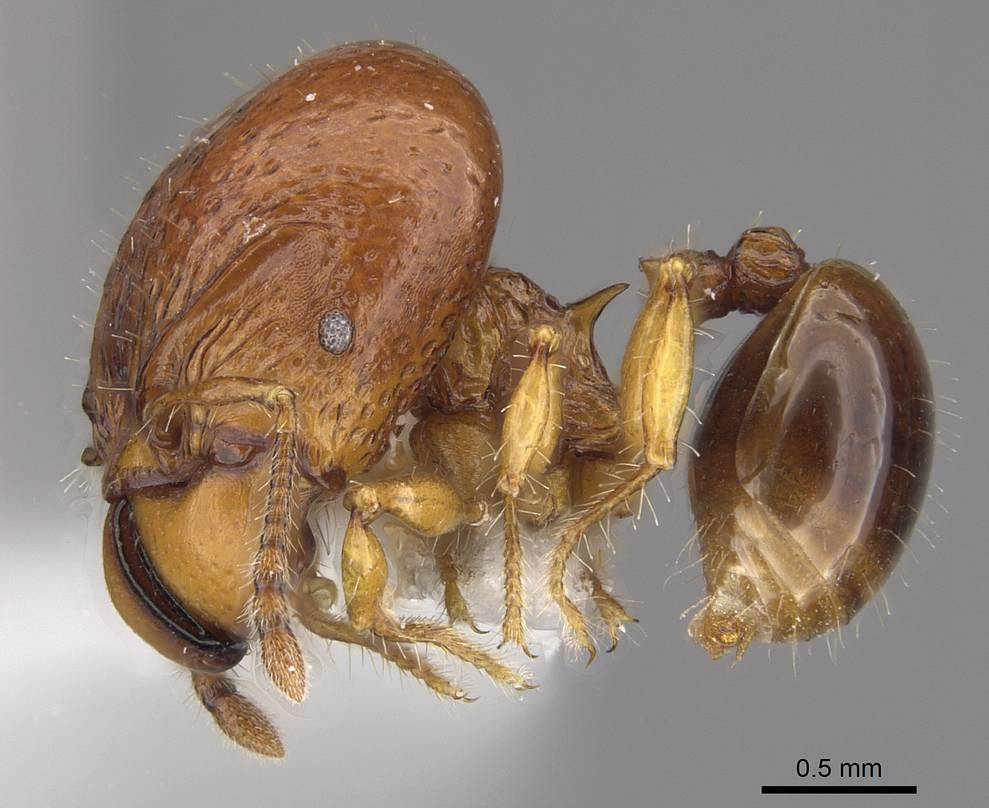

Scientific classification
- Domain: Eukaryota
- Kingdom: Animalia
- Phylum: Arthropoda
- Class: Insecta
- Order: Hymenoptera
- Family: Formicidae
- Subfamily: Myrmicinae
- Genus: Acanthomyrmex
- Species: A. humilis

Binomial name
- Acanthomyrmex humilis Eguchi, Bui & Yamane, 2008

= Acanthomyrmex humilis =

Species of ant

Acanthomyrmex humilis is a species of ant that belongs to the genus Acanthomyrmex. It was described by Eguchi, Bui and Yamane in 2008, and is abundant in Vietnam.
