= Acanthomyrmex minus =

Scientific classification
- Domain: Eukaryota
- Kingdom: Animalia
- Phylum: Arthropoda
- Class: Insecta
- Order: Hymenoptera
- Family: Formicidae
- Subfamily: Myrmicinae
- Genus: Acanthomyrmex
- Species: A. minus

Binomial name
- Acanthomyrmex minus Terayama, Ito & Gobin, 1998

Species of ant

Acanthomyrmex minus is a species of ant which is a part of the genus Acanthomyrmex. Terayam, Ito & Gobin described the species in 1998, and the species is native to Indonesia.
