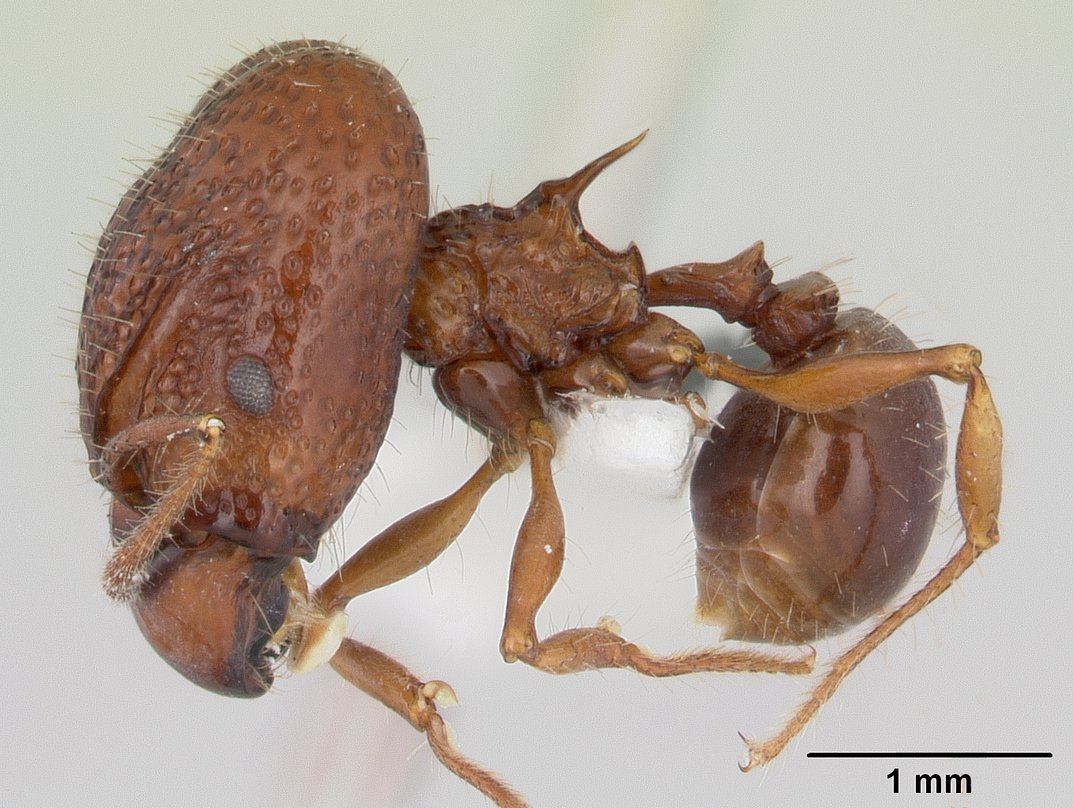
- A. basispinosus worker

Scientific classification
- Domain: Eukaryota
- Kingdom: Animalia
- Phylum: Arthropoda
- Class: Insecta
- Order: Hymenoptera
- Family: Formicidae
- Subfamily: Myrmicinae
- Genus: Acanthomyrmex
- Species: A. basispinosus

Binomial name
- Acanthomyrmex basispinosus Moffett, 1986

= Acanthomyrmex basispinosus =

Species of ant

Acanthomyrmex basispinosus is a species of ant of the genus Acanthomyrmex. It was described by Moffett in 1986, and is found in Indonesia.
