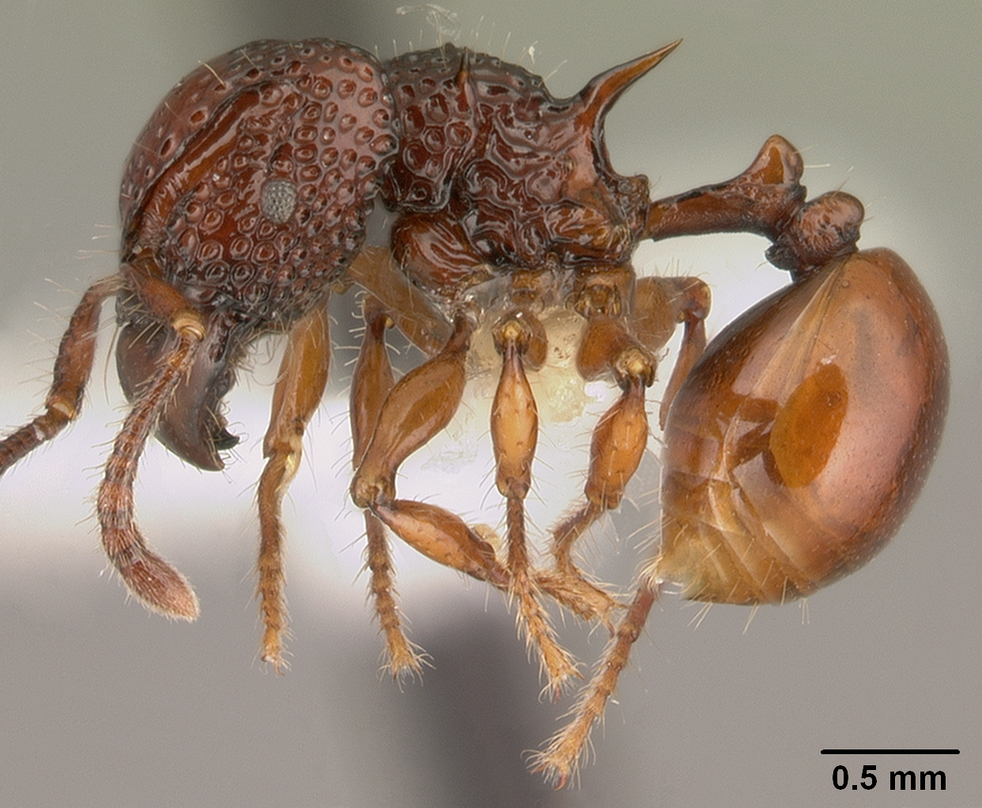
- Acanthomyrmex concavus worker

Scientific classification
- Kingdom: Animalia
- Phylum: Arthropoda
- Clade: Pancrustacea
- Class: Insecta
- Order: Hymenoptera
- Family: Formicidae
- Subfamily: Myrmicinae
- Tribe: Crematogastrini
- Alliance: Myrmecina genus group
- Genus: Acanthomyrmex; Emery, 1893

Type species
- Acanthomyrmex luciolae Emery, 1893

= Acanthomyrmex =

Genus of ants

Acanthomyrmex, from Ancient Greek ἄκανθα (ákantha), meaning "thorn", and μύρμηξ (múrmex), meaning "ant", is a genus of ants in the subfamily Myrmicinae. The genus is known from South East Asia. Its species are dimorphic, with major workers in some genera having heads twice the length (and ten times the volume) of those of the minor workers. They live in small colonies and are rarely collected in the field. There are 17 species of Acanthomyrmex.

== List of species ==
Scientific name	Authority	Major worker picture	Minor worker picture
Acanthomyrmex basispinosus	Moffett, 1986		
Acanthomyrmex careoscrobis	Moffett, 1986		
Acanthomyrmex concavus	Moffett, 1986		
Acanthomyrmex crassispinus	Wheeler, W.M., 1930		
Acanthomyrmex dusun	Wheeler, W.M., 1919		
Acanthomyrmex ferox	Emery, 1893		
Acanthomyrmex foveolatus	Moffett, 1986		
Acanthomyrmex glabfemoralis	Zhou & Zheng, 1997		
Acanthomyrmex humilis	Eguchi, Bui & Yamane, 2008		
Acanthomyrmex laevis	Moffett, 1986		
Acanthomyrmex luciolae	Emery, 1893		
Acanthomyrmex mindanao	Moffett, 1986		
Acanthomyrmex minus	Terayama, Ito & Gobin, 1998		
Acanthomyrmex notabilis	Smith, F., 1860		
Acanthomyrmex padanensis	Terayama, Ito & Gobin, 1998		
Acanthomyrmex sulawesiensis	Terayama, Ito & Gobin, 1998		
Acanthomyrmex thailandensis	Terayama, 1995		
