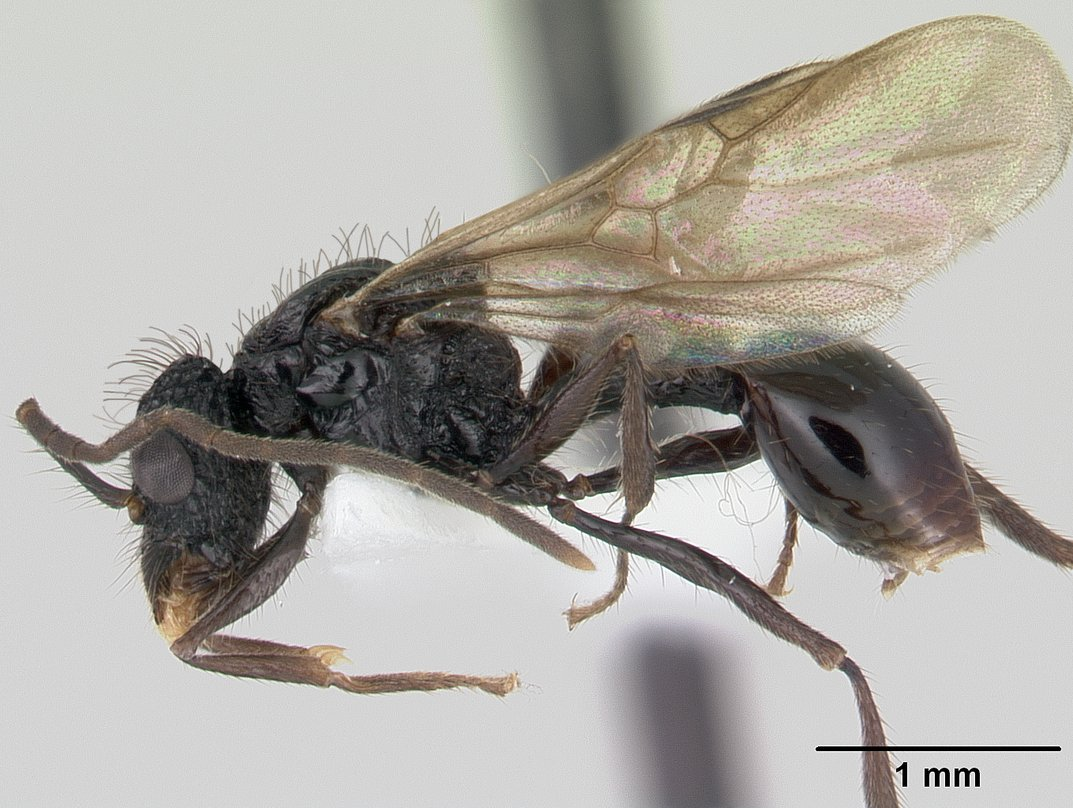
- Acanthomyrmex ferox winged specimen

Scientific classification
- Domain: Eukaryota
- Kingdom: Animalia
- Phylum: Arthropoda
- Class: Insecta
- Order: Hymenoptera
- Family: Formicidae
- Subfamily: Myrmicinae
- Genus: Acanthomyrmex
- Species: A. ferox

Binomial name
- Acanthomyrmex ferox Emery, 1893

= Acanthomyrmex ferox =

Species of ant

Acanthomyrmex ferox is a species of ant that belongs to the genus Acanthomyrmex. It was described by Emery in 1893, and is found in Malaysia and Thailand.
