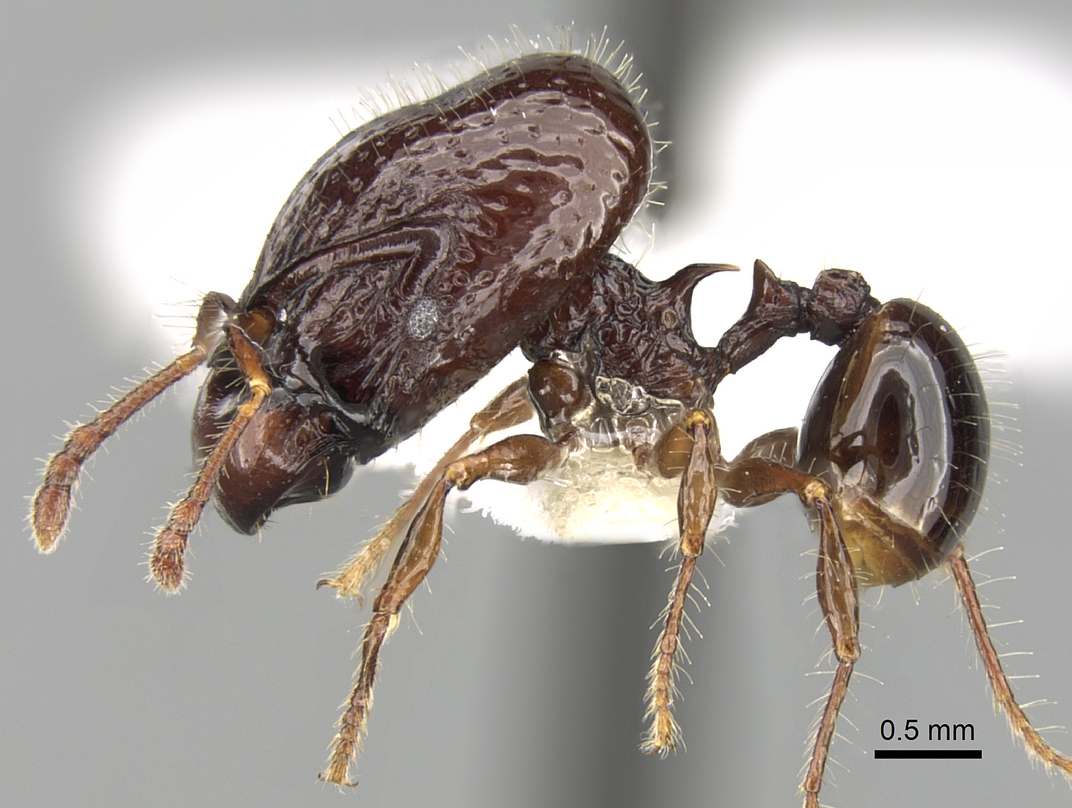

Scientific classification
- Domain: Eukaryota
- Kingdom: Animalia
- Phylum: Arthropoda
- Class: Insecta
- Order: Hymenoptera
- Family: Formicidae
- Subfamily: Myrmicinae
- Genus: Acanthomyrmex
- Species: A. dusun

Binomial name
- Acanthomyrmex dusun Wheeler, 1919

= Acanthomyrmex dusun =

Species of ant

Acanthomyrmex dusun is a species of ant that belongs to the genus Acanthomyrmex. It was described by Wheeler in 1919, and is found in Indonesia.
