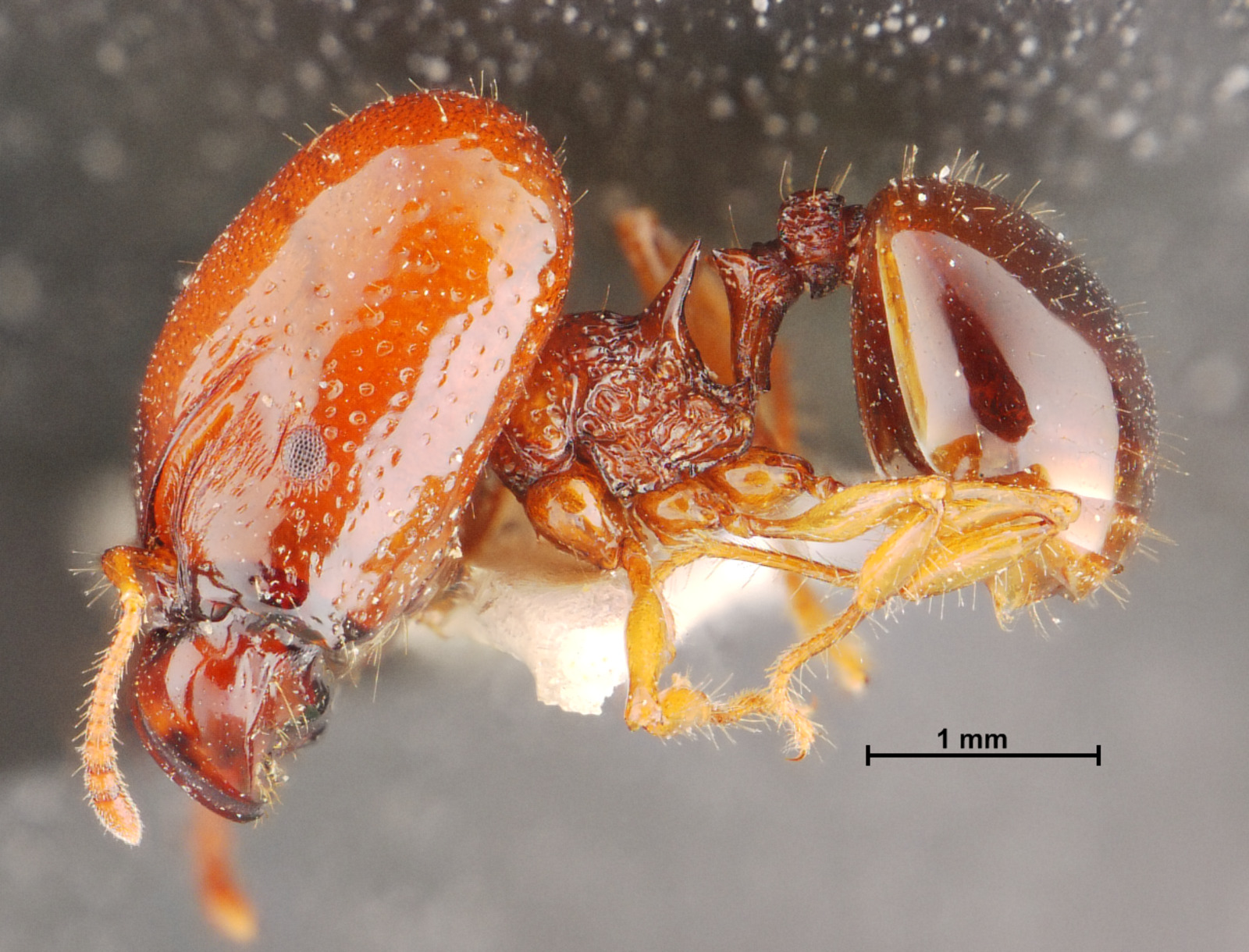
- Side close-up of Anthomyrmex thailandensis

Scientific classification
- Domain: Eukaryota
- Kingdom: Animalia
- Phylum: Arthropoda
- Class: Insecta
- Order: Hymenoptera
- Family: Formicidae
- Subfamily: Myrmicinae
- Genus: Acanthomyrmex
- Species: A. thailandensis

Binomial name
- Acanthomyrmex thailandensis Terayama, 1995

= Acanthomyrmex thailandensis =

Species of ant

Acanthomyrmex thailandensis is a species of ant which belongs to the genus Acanthomyrmex. Terayama first described the species in 1995, and it is native and only distributed in Thailand.
