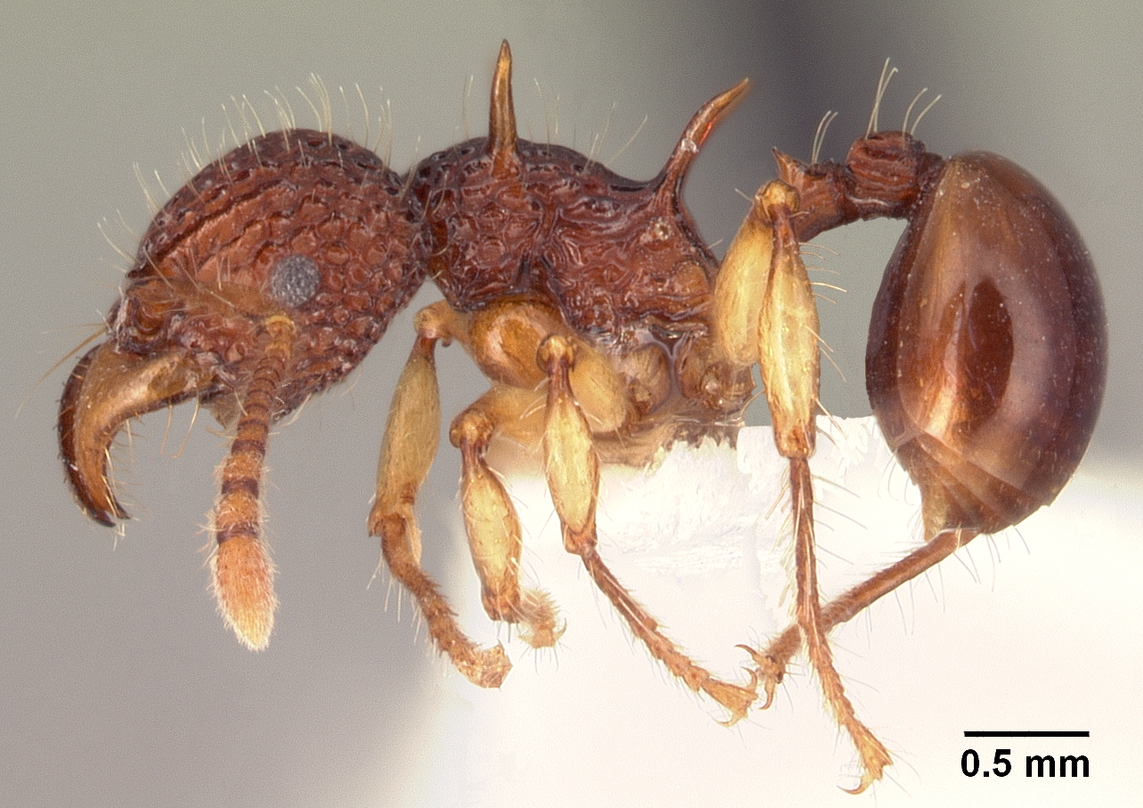
- Acanthomyrmex crasispinus worker

Scientific classification
- Domain: Eukaryota
- Kingdom: Animalia
- Phylum: Arthropoda
- Class: Insecta
- Order: Hymenoptera
- Family: Formicidae
- Subfamily: Myrmicinae
- Genus: Acanthomyrmex
- Species: A. crassispinus

Binomial name
- Acanthomyrmex crassispinus Wheeler, 1930

= Acanthomyrmex crassispinus =

Species of ant

Acanthomyrmex crassispinus is a species of ant that belongs to the genus Acanthomyrmex. It was described by Wheeler in 1930, and is found in Taiwan.
