= Acanthomyrmex foveolatus =

Scientific classification
- Domain: Eukaryota
- Kingdom: Animalia
- Phylum: Arthropoda
- Class: Insecta
- Order: Hymenoptera
- Family: Formicidae
- Subfamily: Myrmicinae
- Genus: Acanthomyrmex
- Species: A. foveolatus

Binomial name
- Acanthomyrmex foveolatus Moffett, 1986

Species of ant

Acanthomyrmex foveolatus is a species of ant that belongs to the genus Acanthomyrmex. It was described by Moffett in 1986, and is found in Indonesia.
