= A. leleupi =

A. leleupi may refer to:

- Abacetus leleupi, a ground beetle
- Agonidium leleupi, a ground beetle
- Allurjapyx leleupi, a dipluran
