= Agonidium cyanipenne =

Scientific classification
- Domain: Eukaryota
- Kingdom: Animalia
- Phylum: Arthropoda
- Class: Insecta
- Order: Coleoptera
- Suborder: Adephaga
- Family: Carabidae
- Genus: Agonidium
- Species: A. cyanipenne

Binomial name
- Agonidium cyanipenne (Bates, 1892)

Species of beetle

Agonidium cyanipenne is a species of ground beetle in the subfamily Platyninae! It was described by Henry Walter Bates in 1892.
