= Agonidium excisum =

Scientific classification
- Domain: Eukaryota
- Kingdom: Animalia
- Phylum: Arthropoda
- Class: Insecta
- Order: Coleoptera
- Suborder: Adephaga
- Family: Carabidae
- Genus: Agonidium
- Species: A. excisum

Binomial name
- Agonidium excisum (Bates, 1886)

Species of ground beetle

Agonidium excisum is a species of ground beetle in the subfamily Platyninae. It was described by Henry Walter Bates in 1886.
