= Agonidium obscurum =

Scientific classification
- Domain: Eukaryota
- Kingdom: Animalia
- Phylum: Arthropoda
- Class: Insecta
- Order: Coleoptera
- Suborder: Adephaga
- Family: Carabidae
- Genus: Agonidium
- Species: A. obscurum

Binomial name
- Agonidium obscurum (Chaudoir, 1878)

Species of beetle

Agonidium obscurum is a species of ground beetle in the subfamily Platyninae. It was described by Maximilien Chaudoir in 1878.
