= Agonidium madecassum =

Scientific classification
- Domain: Eukaryota
- Kingdom: Animalia
- Phylum: Arthropoda
- Class: Insecta
- Order: Coleoptera
- Suborder: Adephaga
- Family: Carabidae
- Genus: Agonidium
- Species: A. madecassum

Binomial name
- Agonidium madecassum (Csiki, 1931)

Species of beetle

Agonidium madecassum is a species of ground beetle in the subfamily Platyninae. It was described by Csiki in 1931.
