= Agonidium strenuum =

Scientific classification
- Domain: Eukaryota
- Kingdom: Animalia
- Phylum: Arthropoda
- Class: Insecta
- Order: Coleoptera
- Suborder: Adephaga
- Family: Carabidae
- Genus: Agonidium
- Species: A. strenuum

Binomial name
- Agonidium strenuum (Chaudoir, 1876)

Species of beetle

Agonidium strenuum is a species of ground beetle in the subfamily Platyninae. It was described by Maximilien Chaudoir in 1876.
