= Agonidium betsileo =

Scientific classification
- Domain: Eukaryota
- Kingdom: Animalia
- Phylum: Arthropoda
- Class: Insecta
- Order: Coleoptera
- Suborder: Adephaga
- Family: Carabidae
- Genus: Agonidium
- Species: A. betsileo

Binomial name
- Agonidium betsileo (Alluaud, 1932)

Species of beetle

Agonidium betsileo is a species of ground beetle in the subfamily Platyninae. It was described by Alluaud in 1932.
