= Agonidium itremense =

Scientific classification
- Domain: Eukaryota
- Kingdom: Animalia
- Phylum: Arthropoda
- Class: Insecta
- Order: Coleoptera
- Suborder: Adephaga
- Family: Carabidae
- Genus: Agonidium
- Species: A. itremense

Binomial name
- Agonidium itremense (Basilewsky, 1985)

Species of beetle

Agonidium itremense is a species of ground beetle in the subfamily Platyninae. It was described by Basilewsky in 1985.
