= Agonidium rugosicolle =

Scientific classification
- Domain: Eukaryota
- Kingdom: Animalia
- Phylum: Arthropoda
- Class: Insecta
- Order: Coleoptera
- Suborder: Adephaga
- Family: Carabidae
- Genus: Agonidium
- Species: A. rugosicolle

Binomial name
- Agonidium rugosicolle (Gemminger & Harold, 1868)

Synonyms
- Megalonychus rugosicollis (Gemminger & Harold, 1868)

Species of beetle

Agonidium rugosicolle is a species of ground beetle in the subfamily Platyninae. It was described by Gemminger & Harold in 1868.
