= Agonidium parvicolle =

Scientific classification
- Domain: Eukaryota
- Kingdom: Animalia
- Phylum: Arthropoda
- Class: Insecta
- Order: Coleoptera
- Suborder: Adephaga
- Family: Carabidae
- Genus: Agonidium
- Species: A. parvicolle

Binomial name
- Agonidium parvicolle (Basilewsky, 1958)

Species of beetle

Agonidium parvicolle is a species of ground beetle in the subfamily Platyninae. It was described by Basilewsky in 1958.
