= Agonidium mus =

Scientific classification
- Domain: Eukaryota
- Kingdom: Animalia
- Phylum: Arthropoda
- Class: Insecta
- Order: Coleoptera
- Suborder: Adephaga
- Family: Carabidae
- Genus: Agonidium
- Species: A. mus

Binomial name
- Agonidium mus (Basilewsky, 1953)

Species of beetle

Agonidium mus is a species of ground beetle in the subfamily Platyninae. It was described by Pierre Basilewsky in 1953.
