= Agonidium alacre =

Scientific classification
- Kingdom: Animalia
- Phylum: Arthropoda
- Class: Insecta
- Order: Coleoptera
- Suborder: Adephaga
- Family: Carabidae
- Genus: Agonidium
- Species: A. alacre

Binomial name
- Agonidium alacre (Boheman, 1848)

Species of beetle

Agonidium alacre is a species of ground beetle in the subfamily Platyninae. It was described by Boheman in 1848.
