= Agonidium rufipes =

Scientific classification
- Kingdom: Animalia
- Phylum: Arthropoda
- Class: Insecta
- Order: Coleoptera
- Suborder: Adephaga
- Family: Carabidae
- Genus: Agonidium
- Species: A. rufipes

Binomial name
- Agonidium rufipes (Dejean, 1831)

Species of beetle

Agonidium rufipes is a species of ground beetle in the subfamily Platyninae. It was described by Pierre François Marie Auguste Dejean in 1831.
