= Agonidium kapiriense =

Scientific classification
- Kingdom: Animalia
- Phylum: Arthropoda
- Class: Insecta
- Order: Coleoptera
- Suborder: Adephaga
- Family: Carabidae
- Genus: Agonidium
- Species: A. kapiriense

Binomial name
- Agonidium kapiriense (Burgeon, 1935)

Species of beetle

Agonidium kapiriense is a species of ground beetle in the subfamily Platyninae. It was described by Burgeon in 1935.
