= Agonidium rufoaeneum =

Scientific classification
- Domain: Eukaryota
- Kingdom: Animalia
- Phylum: Arthropoda
- Class: Insecta
- Order: Coleoptera
- Suborder: Adephaga
- Family: Carabidae
- Genus: Agonidium
- Species: A. rufoaeneum

Binomial name
- Agonidium rufoaeneum (Reiche, 1847)

Species of beetle

Agonidium rufoaeneum is a species of ground beetle in the subfamily Platyninae. It was described by Reiche in 1847.
