= Agonidium fuscicorne =

Scientific classification
- Kingdom: Animalia
- Phylum: Arthropoda
- Clade: Pancrustacea
- Class: Insecta
- Order: Coleoptera
- Suborder: Adephaga
- Superfamily: Caraboidea
- Family: Carabidae
- Subfamily: Platyninae
- Genus: Agonidium
- Species: A. fuscicorne

Binomial name
- Agonidium fuscicorne (Guérin-Méneville, 1847)

Species of beetle

Agonidium fuscicorne is a species in the beetle family Carabidae. It is found in Africa.

== Subspecies ==
These two subspecies belong to the species Agonidium fuscicorne:

- Agonidium fuscicorne fuscicorne (Guérin-Méneville, 1847) (Yemen, Eritrea, and the Democratic Republic of the Congo)
- Agonidium fuscicorne venustulum (Basilewsky, 1946) (Burkina Faso)
