= Agonidium nyikense =

Scientific classification
- Domain: Eukaryota
- Kingdom: Animalia
- Phylum: Arthropoda
- Class: Insecta
- Order: Coleoptera
- Suborder: Adephaga
- Family: Carabidae
- Genus: Agonidium
- Species: A. nyikense

Binomial name
- Agonidium nyikense (Basilewsky, 1988)

Species of beetle

Agonidium nyikense is a species of ground beetle in the subfamily Platyninae. It was described by Basilewsky in 1988.
