= Agonidium =

Scientific classification
- Kingdom: Animalia
- Phylum: Arthropoda
- Class: Insecta
- Order: Coleoptera
- Suborder: Adephaga
- Family: Carabidae
- Subfamily: Platyninae
- Genus: Agonidium; Jeannel, 1948

Genus of beetles

Agonidium is a genus of beetles in the family Carabidae, containing the following species:

- Agonidium alacre (Boheman, 1848)
- Agonidium amplipenne (Gestro, 1895)
- Agonidium babaulti (Burgeon, 1935)
- Agonidium bamboutense (Burgeon, 1942)
- Agonidium betsileo (Alluaud, 1932)
- Agonidium birmanicum (Bates, 1892)
- Agonidium camerunicum (Basilewsky, 1985)
- Agonidium chowo (Basilewsky, 1988)
- Agonidium comoricum (Basilewsky, 1985)
- Agonidium cyanipenne (Bates, 1892)
- Agonidium descarpentriesi (Basilewsky, 1985)
- Agonidium dilaticolle (Bates, 1892)
- Agonidium excisum (Bates, 1886)
- Agonidium explanatum (Bates, 1889)
- Agonidium exultans (Basilewsky, 1988)
- Agonidium fuscicorne (Guerin-Meneville, 1847)
- Agonidium gracile (Peringuey, 1896)
- Agonidium hyporobium (Burgeon, 1935)
- Agonidium itremense (Basilewsky, 1985)
- Agonidium jemjemense (Burgeon, 1937)
- Agonidium johnstoni (Alluaud, 1917)
- Agonidium kahuzianum (Basilewsky, 1975)
- Agonidium kapiriense (Burgeon, 1935)
- Agonidium kedongianum (Basilewsky, 1946)
- Agonidium kenyense (Alluaud, 1917)
- Agonidium kikuyu (Burgeon, 1935)
- Agonidium kinangopinum (Alluaud, 1917)
- Agonidium lebisi (Jeannel, 1948)
- Agonidium leleupi (Basilewsky, 1951)
- Agonidium longeantennatum (Burgeon, 1942)
- Agonidium madecassum (Csiki, 1931)
- Agonidium milloti (Jeannel, 1948)
- Agonidium mus (Basilewsky, 1953)
- Agonidium natalense (Boheman, 1848)
- Agonidium nepalense (Habu, 1973)
- Agonidium nidicola (Jeannel, 1951)
- Agonidium nyakagerae (Basilewsky, 1988)
- Agonidium nyikense (Basilewsky, 1988)
- Agonidium obscurum (Chaudoir, 1878)
- Agonidium oldeanicum (Basilewsky, 1962)
- Agonidium parvicolle (Basilewsky, 1958)
- Agonidium rhytoctonum (Basilewsky, 1976)
- Agonidium rufipes (Dejean, 1831)
- Agonidium rufoaeneum (Reiche, 1847)
- Agonidium rugosicolle (Gemminger & Harold, 1868)
- Agonidium strenuum (Chaudoir, 1876)
- Agonidium swahilius (Bates, 1886)
- Agonidium viphyense (Basilewsky, 1988)
- Agonidium wittei (Basilewsky, 1953)
