= Agonidium nepalense =

Scientific classification
- Kingdom: Animalia
- Phylum: Arthropoda
- Class: Insecta
- Order: Coleoptera
- Suborder: Adephaga
- Family: Carabidae
- Genus: Agonidium
- Species: A. nepalense

Binomial name
- Agonidium nepalense (Habu, 1973)

Species of beetle

Agonidium nepalense is a species of ground beetle in the subfamily Platyninae. It was described by Habu in 1973.
