= Agonidium amplipenne =

Scientific classification
- Domain: Eukaryota
- Kingdom: Animalia
- Phylum: Arthropoda
- Class: Insecta
- Order: Coleoptera
- Suborder: Adephaga
- Family: Carabidae
- Genus: Agonidium
- Species: A. amplipenne

Binomial name
- Agonidium amplipenne (Gestro, 1895)

Species of beetle

Agonidium amplipenne is a species of ground beetle in the subfamily Platyninae. It was described by Gestro in 1895.
