= Agonidium gracile =

Scientific classification
- Domain: Eukaryota
- Kingdom: Animalia
- Phylum: Arthropoda
- Class: Insecta
- Order: Coleoptera
- Suborder: Adephaga
- Family: Carabidae
- Genus: Agonidium
- Species: A. gracile

Binomial name
- Agonidium gracile (Peringuey, 1896)

Species of beetle

Agonidium gracile is a species of ground beetle in the subfamily Platyninae. It was described by Peringuey in 1896.
