= Agonidium longeantennatum =

Scientific classification
- Kingdom: Animalia
- Phylum: Arthropoda
- Class: Insecta
- Order: Coleoptera
- Suborder: Adephaga
- Family: Carabidae
- Genus: Agonidium
- Species: A. longeantennatum

Binomial name
- Agonidium longeantennatum (Burgeon, 1942)

Species of beetle

Agonidium longeantennatum is a species of ground beetle in the subfamily Platyninae. It was described by Burgeon in 1942.
