= Abacetus leleupi =

Scientific classification
- Kingdom: Animalia
- Phylum: Arthropoda
- Class: Insecta
- Order: Coleoptera
- Suborder: Adephaga
- Family: Carabidae
- Genus: Abacetus
- Species: A. leleupi

Binomial name
- Abacetus leleupi Straneo, 1951

Species of beetle

Abacetus leleupi is a species of ground beetle in the subfamily Pterostichinae. It was described by Straneo in 1951. The species is named after the Belgian entomologist Narcisse Leleup, who extensively collected specimens in the Democratic Republic of the Congo (formerly the Belgian Congo) for the Royal Museum for Central Africa.
