= Agonidium leleupi =

Scientific classification
- Domain: Eukaryota
- Kingdom: Animalia
- Phylum: Arthropoda
- Class: Insecta
- Order: Coleoptera
- Suborder: Adephaga
- Family: Carabidae
- Genus: Agonidium
- Species: A. leleupi

Binomial name
- Agonidium leleupi (Basilewsky, 1951)

Species of beetle

Agonidium leleupi is a species of ground beetle in the subfamily Platyninae. It was described by Pierre Basilewsky in 1951.
