= Necydalopsini =

Scientific classification
- Kingdom: Animalia
- Phylum: Arthropoda
- Class: Insecta
- Order: Coleoptera
- Suborder: Polyphaga
- Infraorder: Cucujiformia
- Family: Cerambycidae
- Subfamily: Cerambycinae
- Tribe: Necydalopsini; Blanchard, 1851

Tribe of beetles

Necydalopsini is a tribe of beetles in the subfamily Cerambycinae, containing the following genera:

- Abaiba
- Austronecydalopsis
- Eucharassus
- Lissozodes
- Necydalopsis
- Ozodes
- Parepimelitta
- Piruapsis
- Saltanecydalopsis
- Sthelenus
