= A. iridipennis =

A. iridipennis may refer to:

- Abacetus iridipennis, a ground beetle
- Austronecydalopsis iridipennis, a longhorn beetle
