= Sthelenus morosus =

Scientific classification
- Kingdom: Animalia
- Phylum: Arthropoda
- Class: Insecta
- Order: Coleoptera
- Suborder: Polyphaga
- Infraorder: Cucujiformia
- Family: Cerambycidae
- Genus: Sthelenus
- Species: S. morosus

Binomial name
- Sthelenus morosus Pascoe, 1862

Species of beetle

Sthelenus morosus is a species of beetle in the family Cerambycidae. It was described by Pascoe in 1862.
