= Sthelenus =

Scientific classification
- Kingdom: Animalia
- Phylum: Arthropoda
- Class: Insecta
- Order: Coleoptera
- Suborder: Polyphaga
- Infraorder: Cucujiformia
- Family: Cerambycidae
- Tribe: Necydalopsini
- Genus: Sthelenus

Genus of beetles

Sthelenus is a genus of beetles in the family Cerambycidae, containing the following species:

- Sthelenus ichneumoneus Buquet, 1859
- Sthelenus morosus Pascoe, 1862
