= Parepimelitta =

Scientific classification
- Kingdom: Animalia
- Phylum: Arthropoda
- Class: Insecta
- Order: Coleoptera
- Suborder: Polyphaga
- Infraorder: Cucujiformia
- Family: Cerambycidae
- Tribe: Necydalopsini
- Genus: Parepimelitta

Genus of beetles

Parepimelitta is a genus of beetles in the family Cerambycidae, containing the following species:

- Parepimelitta barriai (Cerda, 1968)
- Parepimelitta femoralis (Fairmaire & Germain, 1859)
