= Eucharassus bicolor =

Scientific classification
- Kingdom: Animalia
- Phylum: Arthropoda
- Class: Insecta
- Order: Coleoptera
- Suborder: Polyphaga
- Infraorder: Cucujiformia
- Family: Cerambycidae
- Genus: Eucharassus
- Species: E. bicolor

Binomial name
- Eucharassus bicolor Melzer, 1934

Species of beetle

Eucharassus bicolor is a species of beetle in the family Cerambycidae. It was described by Melzer in 1934.
