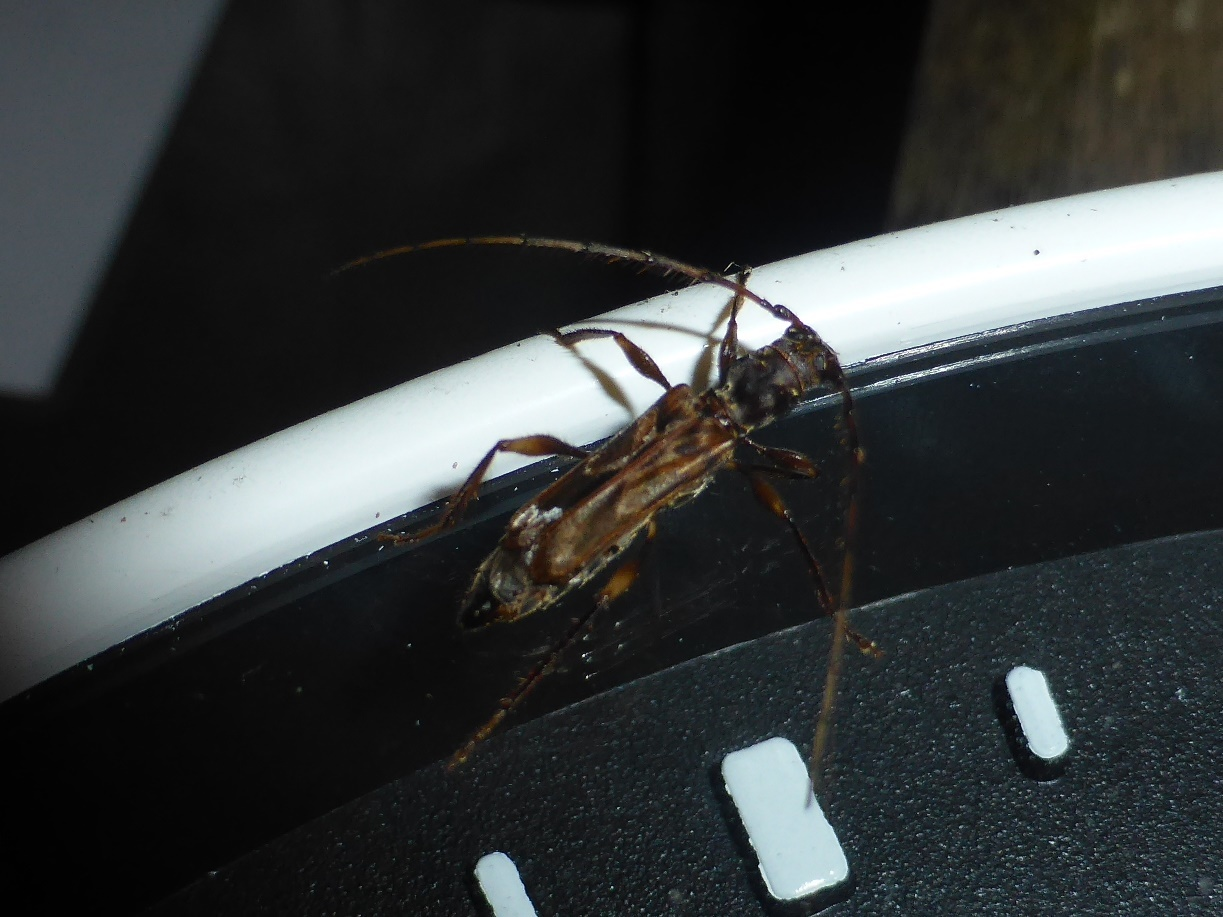

Scientific classification
- Kingdom: Animalia
- Phylum: Arthropoda
- Class: Insecta
- Order: Coleoptera
- Suborder: Polyphaga
- Infraorder: Cucujiformia
- Family: Cerambycidae
- Genus: Ozodes
- Species: O. infuscatus

Binomial name
- Ozodes infuscatus Bates, 1870

= Ozodes infuscatus =

Species of beetle

Ozodes infuscatus is a species of beetle in the family Cerambycidae. It was described by H. W. Bates in 1870.
