= Austronecydalopsis curkovici =

Scientific classification
- Kingdom: Animalia
- Phylum: Arthropoda
- Class: Insecta
- Order: Coleoptera
- Suborder: Polyphaga
- Infraorder: Cucujiformia
- Family: Cerambycidae
- Genus: Austronecydalopsis
- Species: A. curkovici

Binomial name
- Austronecydalopsis curkovici Barriga & Cepeda, 2007

Species of beetle

Austronecydalopsis curkovici is a species of beetle in the family Cerambycidae. It was described by Barriga and Cepeda in 2007.
