= Ozodes malthinoides =

Scientific classification
- Kingdom: Animalia
- Phylum: Arthropoda
- Class: Insecta
- Order: Coleoptera
- Suborder: Polyphaga
- Infraorder: Cucujiformia
- Family: Cerambycidae
- Genus: Ozodes
- Species: O. malthinoides

Binomial name
- Ozodes malthinoides Bates, 1870

Species of beetle

Ozodes malthinoides is a species of beetle in the family Cerambycidae. It was described by Bates in 1870.
