= Ozodes xanthophasma =

Scientific classification
- Kingdom: Animalia
- Phylum: Arthropoda
- Class: Insecta
- Order: Coleoptera
- Suborder: Polyphaga
- Infraorder: Cucujiformia
- Family: Cerambycidae
- Genus: Ozodes
- Species: O. xanthophasma

Binomial name
- Ozodes xanthophasma Bates, 1872

Species of beetle

Ozodes xanthophasma is a species of beetle in the family Cerambycidae. It was described by Bates in 1872.
