= Ozodes ibidiinus =

Scientific classification
- Kingdom: Animalia
- Phylum: Arthropoda
- Class: Insecta
- Order: Coleoptera
- Suborder: Polyphaga
- Infraorder: Cucujiformia
- Family: Cerambycidae
- Genus: Ozodes
- Species: O. ibidiinus

Binomial name
- Ozodes ibidiinus Bates, 1870

Species of beetle

Ozodes ibidiinus is a species of beetle in the family Cerambycidae. It was described by Bates in 1870.
