= Ozodes sexmaculatus =

Scientific classification
- Kingdom: Animalia
- Phylum: Arthropoda
- Class: Insecta
- Order: Coleoptera
- Suborder: Polyphaga
- Infraorder: Cucujiformia
- Family: Cerambycidae
- Genus: Ozodes
- Species: O. sexmaculatus

Binomial name
- Ozodes sexmaculatus Zajciw, 1967

Species of beetle

Ozodes sexmaculatus is a species of beetle in the family Cerambycidae. It was described by Zajciw in 1967.
