= Ozodes nodicollis =

Scientific classification
- Kingdom: Animalia
- Phylum: Arthropoda
- Class: Insecta
- Order: Coleoptera
- Suborder: Polyphaga
- Infraorder: Cucujiformia
- Family: Cerambycidae
- Genus: Ozodes
- Species: O. nodicollis

Binomial name
- Ozodes nodicollis Audinet-Serville, 1834

Species of beetle

Ozodes nodicollis is a species of beetle in the family Cerambycidae. It was described by Audinet-Serville in 1834.
