= Eucharassus =

Scientific classification
- Domain: Eukaryota
- Kingdom: Animalia
- Phylum: Arthropoda
- Class: Insecta
- Order: Coleoptera
- Suborder: Polyphaga
- Infraorder: Cucujiformia
- Family: Cerambycidae
- Subfamily: Cerambycinae
- Tribe: Necydalopsini
- Genus: Eucharassus; Bates, 1885

Genus of beetles

Eucharassus is a genus of beetles in the family Cerambycidae, containing the following species:

- Eucharassus bicolor Melzer, 1934
- Eucharassus chemsaki Monne, 2007
- Eucharassus confusus Galileo & Martins, 2001
- Eucharassus dispar Bates, 1885
- Eucharassus flavotibiale Galileo & Martins, 2001
- Eucharassus hovorei Monne, 2007
- Eucharassus lingafelteri Monne, 2007
- Eucharassus nevermanni Melzer, 1934
- Eucharassus nigratus Martins & Galileo, 2009
- Eucharassus nisseri Aurivillius, 1891
- Eucharassus wappesi Monne, 2007
