= Eucharassus dispar =

Scientific classification
- Domain: Eukaryota
- Kingdom: Animalia
- Phylum: Arthropoda
- Class: Insecta
- Order: Coleoptera
- Suborder: Polyphaga
- Infraorder: Cucujiformia
- Family: Cerambycidae
- Genus: Eucharassus
- Species: E. dispar

Binomial name
- Eucharassus dispar Bates, 1885

Species of beetle

Eucharassus dispar is a species of beetle in the family Cerambycidae. It was described by Henry Walter Bates in 1885.
