= Parepimelitta barriai =

Scientific classification
- Kingdom: Animalia
- Phylum: Arthropoda
- Class: Insecta
- Order: Coleoptera
- Suborder: Polyphaga
- Infraorder: Cucujiformia
- Family: Cerambycidae
- Genus: Parepimelitta
- Species: P. barriai

Binomial name
- Parepimelitta barriai (Cerda, 1968)

Species of beetle

Parepimelitta barriai is a species of beetle in the family Cerambycidae. It was described by Cerda in 1968.
