= Sthelenus ichneumoneus =

Scientific classification
- Kingdom: Animalia
- Phylum: Arthropoda
- Class: Insecta
- Order: Coleoptera
- Suborder: Polyphaga
- Infraorder: Cucujiformia
- Family: Cerambycidae
- Genus: Sthelenus
- Species: S. ichneumoneus

Binomial name
- Sthelenus ichneumoneus Buquet, 1859

Species of beetle

Sthelenus ichneumoneus is a species of beetle in the family Cerambycidae. It was described by Buquet in 1859. It is found in South America.
