= Ozodes =

Scientific classification
- Kingdom: Animalia
- Phylum: Arthropoda
- Class: Insecta
- Order: Coleoptera
- Suborder: Polyphaga
- Infraorder: Cucujiformia
- Family: Cerambycidae
- Subfamily: Cerambycinae
- Tribe: Necydalopsini
- Genus: Ozodes; Audinet-Serville, 1834

Genus of beetles

Ozodes is a genus of beetles in the family Cerambycidae, containing the following species:

- Ozodes flavitarsis Gounelle, 1911
- Ozodes ibidiinus Bates, 1870
- Ozodes infuscatus Bates, 1870
- Ozodes malthinoides Bates, 1870
- Ozodes multituberculatus Bates, 1870
- Ozodes nodicollis Audinet-Serville, 1834
- Ozodes sexmaculatus Zajciw, 1967
- Ozodes xanthophasma Bates, 1872
