= Eucharassus nigratus =

Scientific classification
- Domain: Eukaryota
- Kingdom: Animalia
- Phylum: Arthropoda
- Class: Insecta
- Order: Coleoptera
- Suborder: Polyphaga
- Infraorder: Cucujiformia
- Family: Cerambycidae
- Genus: Eucharassus
- Species: E. nigratus

Binomial name
- Eucharassus nigratus Martins & Galileo, 2009

Species of beetle

Eucharassus nigratus is a species of beetle in the family Cerambycidae. It was described by Martins and Galileo in 2009.
