= Austronecydalopsis =

Scientific classification
- Kingdom: Animalia
- Phylum: Arthropoda
- Class: Insecta
- Order: Coleoptera
- Suborder: Polyphaga
- Infraorder: Cucujiformia
- Family: Cerambycidae
- Tribe: Necydalopsini
- Genus: Austronecydalopsis

Genus of beetles

Austronecydalopsis is a genus of beetles in the family Cerambycidae, containing the following species:

- Austronecydalopsis curkovici Barriga & Cepeda, 2007
- Austronecydalopsis iridipennis (Fairmaire & Germain, 1864)
