= Piruapsis =

Piruapsis antennatus

Scientific classification
- Kingdom: Animalia
- Phylum: Arthropoda
- Class: Insecta
- Order: Coleoptera
- Suborder: Polyphaga
- Infraorder: Cucujiformia
- Family: Cerambycidae
- Genus: Piruapsis
- Species: P. antennatus

Binomial name
- Piruapsis antennatus Galileo & Martins, 2006

Genus of beetles

Piruapsis antennatus is a species of beetle in the family Cerambycidae, the only species in the genus Piruapsis.
