= Abaiba =

Scientific classification
- Domain: Eukaryota
- Kingdom: Animalia
- Phylum: Arthropoda
- Class: Insecta
- Order: Coleoptera
- Suborder: Polyphaga
- Infraorder: Cucujiformia
- Family: Cerambycidae
- Genus: Abaiba
- Species: A. dimorphica

Binomial name
- Abaiba dimorphica Martins & Napp, 2007

Genus of beetles

Abaiba is a genus of beetles in the family Cerambycidae, containing a single species, Abaiba dimorphica.
