= Necydalopsis =

Necydalopsis trizonatus

Scientific classification
- Kingdom: Animalia
- Phylum: Arthropoda
- Class: Insecta
- Order: Coleoptera
- Suborder: Polyphaga
- Infraorder: Cucujiformia
- Family: Cerambycidae
- Genus: Necydalopsis
- Species: N. trizonatus

Binomial name
- Necydalopsis trizonatus Blanchard in Gay, 1851

Genus of beetles

Necydalopsis trizonatus is a species of beetle in the family Cerambycidae, the only species in the genus Necydalopsis.
