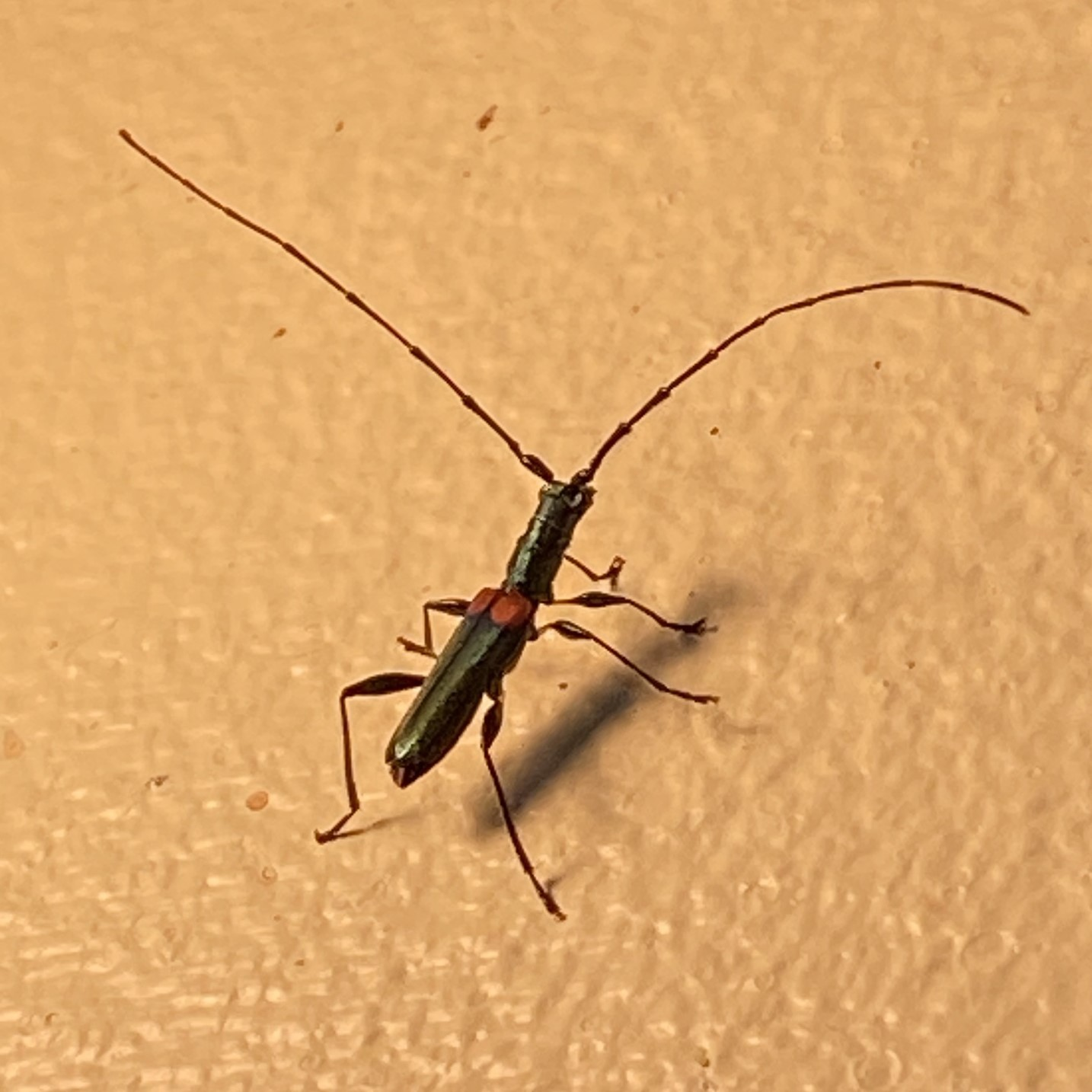

Scientific classification
- Kingdom: Animalia
- Phylum: Arthropoda
- Clade: Pancrustacea
- Class: Insecta
- Order: Coleoptera
- Suborder: Polyphaga
- Infraorder: Cucujiformia
- Family: Cerambycidae
- Genus: Lissozodes; Bates, 1870
- Species: L. basalis

Binomial name
- Lissozodes basalis (White, 1855)

= Lissozodes =

Lissozodes basalis

Genus of beetles

Lissozodes is a genus of beetles in the family Cerambycidae. It is monotypic, being represented by the single species Lissozodes basalis.
