= Saltanecydalopsis =

Saltanecydalopsis irwini

Scientific classification
- Kingdom: Animalia
- Phylum: Arthropoda
- Class: Insecta
- Order: Coleoptera
- Suborder: Polyphaga
- Infraorder: Cucujiformia
- Family: Cerambycidae
- Genus: Saltanecydalopsis
- Species: S. irwini

Binomial name
- Saltanecydalopsis irwini Barriga & Cepeda, 2007

Genus of beetles

Saltanecydalopsis irwini is a species of beetle in the family Cerambycidae, the only species in the genus Saltanecydalopsis.
