= A. chalcopterus =

A. chalcopterus may refer to:

- Abacetus chalcopterus, a ground beetle
- Anisochirus chalcopterus, a ground beetle
- Asymphorodes chalcopterus, a moth found in French Polynesia
