= A. imerinae =

A. imerinae may refer to:

- Abacetus imerinae, a ground beetle
- Anisochirus imerinae, a ground beetle
