= A. impressicollis =

A. impressicollis may refer to:

- Abacetus impressicollis, a ground beetle
- Anisochirus impressicollis, a ground beetle
