= Anisochirus poussereaui =

Scientific classification
- Domain: Eukaryota
- Kingdom: Animalia
- Phylum: Arthropoda
- Class: Insecta
- Order: Coleoptera
- Suborder: Adephaga
- Family: Carabidae
- Subfamily: Harpalinae
- Tribe: Harpalini
- Genus: Anisochirus
- Species: A. poussereaui

Binomial name
- Anisochirus poussereaui Pierre & Mauro, 2010

Synonyms
- Harpalus poussereaui

Species of beetle

Anisochirus poussereaui is a species of ground beetle in the subfamily Harpalinae. It was described by Pierre & Mauro in 2010.

This species was transferred from the genus Harpalus as a result of research published in 2021.
