= Anisochirus obtusiusculus =

Scientific classification
- Domain: Eukaryota
- Kingdom: Animalia
- Phylum: Arthropoda
- Class: Insecta
- Order: Coleoptera
- Suborder: Adephaga
- Family: Carabidae
- Subfamily: Harpalinae
- Tribe: Harpalini
- Genus: Anisochirus
- Species: A. obtusiusculus

Binomial name
- Anisochirus obtusiusculus (Jeannel, 1948)

Species of beetle

Anisochirus obtusiusculus is a species of ground beetle in the subfamily Harpalinae. It was described by Jeannel in 1948.

This species was transferred from the genus Harpalus as a result of research published in 2021.
