= Anisochirus (beetle) =

Scientific classification
- Domain: Eukaryota
- Kingdom: Animalia
- Phylum: Arthropoda
- Class: Insecta
- Order: Coleoptera
- Suborder: Adephaga
- Family: Carabidae
- Subfamily: Harpalinae
- Tribe: Harpalini
- Genus: Anisochirus; Jeannel 1946

Genus of beetles

Anisochirus is a genus of in the beetle family Carabidae. They are found in Madagascar, Réunion, and Mauritius.

The species of this genus were transferred from the genus Harpalus as a result of research published in 2021.

== Species ==
These species are members of the genus Anisochirus.

- Anisochirus brunnipes (Dejean 1829) (Réunion and Mauritius)
- Anisochirus chalcopterus (Jeannel 1948) (Madagascar)
- Anisochirus imerinae (Jeannel 1948) (Madagascar)
- Anisochirus impressicollis (Jeannel 1948) (Madagascar)
- Anisochirus lampronotus (Jeannel 1948) (Madagascar)
- Anisochirus emarginatus
- Anisochirus madagascariensis (Dejean 1831) (Madagascar)
- Anisochirus obtusiusculus (Jeannel 1948) (Madagascar)
- Anisochirus pachys (Jeannel 1948) (Madagascar)
- Anisochirus pecinai (Hovorka 2006) (Réunion)
- Anisochirus poussereaui (Facchini & Giachino 2011) (Réunion)
- Anisochirus seyrigi (Jeannel 1948) (Madagascar)
- Anisochirus sinuatipennis (Jeannel 1948) (Madagascar)
- Anisochirus stricticollis (Jeannel 1948) (Madagascar)
- Anisochirus tenuestriatus (Jeannel 1948) (Madagascar)
  - Anisochirus tenuestriatus tenuestriatus (Madagascar)
  - Anisochirus tenuestriatus sicardi (Jeannel 1948) (Madagascar)
