= Anisochirus madagascariensis =

Scientific classification
- Kingdom: Animalia
- Phylum: Arthropoda
- Class: Insecta
- Order: Coleoptera
- Suborder: Adephaga
- Family: Carabidae
- Tribe: Harpalini
- Genus: Anisochirus
- Species: A. madagascariensis

Binomial name
- Anisochirus madagascariensis (Dejean, 1831)

Species of beetle

Anisochirus madagascariensis is a species of ground beetle in the subfamily Harpalinae. It was described by Dejean in 1831.

This species was transferred from the genus Harpalus as a result of research published in 2021.
