= Anisochirus brunnipes =

Scientific classification
- Kingdom: Animalia
- Phylum: Arthropoda
- Class: Insecta
- Order: Coleoptera
- Suborder: Adephaga
- Family: Carabidae
- Tribe: Harpalini
- Genus: Anisochirus
- Species: A. brunnipes

Binomial name
- Anisochirus brunnipes (Dejean, 1829)

Synonyms
- Harpalus brunnipes

Species of beetle

Anisochirus brunnipes is a species of ground beetle in the subfamily Harpalinae. It was described by Pierre François Marie Auguste Dejean in 1829.

This species was transferred from the genus Harpalus as a result of research published in 2021.
