= Anisochirus imerinae =

Scientific classification
- Kingdom: Animalia
- Phylum: Arthropoda
- Class: Insecta
- Order: Coleoptera
- Suborder: Adephaga
- Family: Carabidae
- Tribe: Harpalini
- Genus: Anisochirus
- Species: A. imerinae

Binomial name
- Anisochirus imerinae (Jeannel, 1948)

Species of beetle

Anisochirus imerinae is a species of ground beetle in the subfamily Harpalinae. It was described by Jeannel in 1948.

This species was transferred from the genus Harpalus as a result of research published in 2021.
