= A. globulicollis =

A. globulicollis may refer to:

- Abacetus globulicollis, a ground beetle
- Anoplomerus globulicollis, a longhorn beetle
