= Anoplomerus rotundicollis =

Scientific classification
- Kingdom: Animalia
- Phylum: Arthropoda
- Class: Insecta
- Order: Coleoptera
- Suborder: Polyphaga
- Infraorder: Cucujiformia
- Family: Cerambycidae
- Genus: Anoplomerus
- Species: A. rotundicollis

Binomial name
- Anoplomerus rotundicollis Guérin-Méneville, 1844

Species of beetle

Anoplomerus rotundicollis is a species of beetle in the family Cerambycidae. It was described by Félix Édouard Guérin-Méneville in 1844.
