= Anoplomerus buqueti =

Scientific classification
- Kingdom: Animalia
- Phylum: Arthropoda
- Class: Insecta
- Order: Coleoptera
- Suborder: Polyphaga
- Infraorder: Cucujiformia
- Family: Cerambycidae
- Genus: Anoplomerus
- Species: A. buqueti

Binomial name
- Anoplomerus buqueti Belon, 1890

Species of beetle

Anoplomerus buqueti is a species of beetle in the family Cerambycidae. It was described by Belon in 1890.
