= Anoplomerus =

Scientific classification
- Kingdom: Animalia
- Phylum: Arthropoda
- Class: Insecta
- Order: Coleoptera
- Suborder: Polyphaga
- Infraorder: Cucujiformia
- Family: Cerambycidae
- Tribe: Hesperophanini
- Genus: Anoplomerus

Genus of beetles

Anoplomerus is a genus of beetles in the family Cerambycidae, containing the following species:

- Anoplomerus buqueti Belon, 1890
- Anoplomerus globulicollis Buquet, 1860
- Anoplomerus rotundicollis Guérin-Méneville, 1844
