= Anoplomerus globulicollis =

Scientific classification
- Kingdom: Animalia
- Phylum: Arthropoda
- Class: Insecta
- Order: Coleoptera
- Suborder: Polyphaga
- Infraorder: Cucujiformia
- Family: Cerambycidae
- Genus: Anoplomerus
- Species: A. globulicollis

Binomial name
- Anoplomerus globulicollis Buquet, 1860

Species of beetle

Anoplomerus globulicollis is a species of beetle in the family Cerambycidae. It was described by Buquet in 1860.
