= A. collarti =

A. collarti may refer to:

- Abacetus collarti, a ground beetle
- Antennexocentrus collarti, a longhorn beetle
