= Antennexocentrus =

Scientific classification
- Kingdom: Animalia
- Phylum: Arthropoda
- Class: Insecta
- Order: Coleoptera
- Suborder: Polyphaga
- Infraorder: Cucujiformia
- Family: Cerambycidae
- Tribe: Acanthocinini
- Genus: Antennexocentrus

Genus of beetles

Antennexocentrus is a genus of beetles in the family Cerambycidae, containing the following species:

- Antennexocentrus bremeri Breuning, 1982
- Antennexocentrus collarti Breuning, 1957
