= A. distigma =

A. distigma may refer to:

- Abacetus distigma, a ground beetle
- Aldoea distigma, a synonym of Eilema distigma, a moth found in Australia
