= A. conradsi =

A. conradsi may refer to:

- Abacetus conradsi, a ground beetle
- Aloeides conradsi, the Conrad's copper, a butterfly found in Africa
