= Abacetus aeneocordatus =

Scientific classification
- Kingdom: Animalia
- Phylum: Arthropoda
- Class: Insecta
- Order: Coleoptera
- Suborder: Adephaga
- Family: Carabidae
- Genus: Abacetus
- Species: A. aeneocordatus

Binomial name
- Abacetus aeneocordatus Straneo, 1940

Species of beetle

Abacetus aeneocordatus is a species of ground beetle in the genus Abacetus. It was described by Straneo in 1940 and is found in Côte d'Ivoire, Africa.
