= Abacetus testaceipes =

Scientific classification
- Domain: Eukaryota
- Kingdom: Animalia
- Phylum: Arthropoda
- Class: Insecta
- Order: Coleoptera
- Suborder: Adephaga
- Family: Carabidae
- Genus: Abacetus
- Species: A. testaceipes

Binomial name
- Abacetus testaceipes (Motschulsky, 1864)

Species of beetle

Abacetus testaceipes is a species of ground beetle in the subfamily Pterostichinae. It was described by Victor Motschulsky in 1864.
