= Abacetus rufopiceus =

Scientific classification
- Domain: Eukaryota
- Kingdom: Animalia
- Phylum: Arthropoda
- Class: Insecta
- Order: Coleoptera
- Suborder: Adephaga
- Family: Carabidae
- Genus: Abacetus
- Species: A. rufopiceus

Binomial name
- Abacetus rufopiceus (Nietner, 1858)

Species of beetle

Abacetus rufopiceus is a species of ground beetle in the subfamily Pterostichinae. It was described by Nietner in 1858.
