= Abacetus elongellus =

Scientific classification
- Kingdom: Animalia
- Phylum: Arthropoda
- Class: Insecta
- Order: Coleoptera
- Suborder: Adephaga
- Family: Carabidae
- Genus: Abacetus
- Species: A. elongellus

Binomial name
- Abacetus elongellus Straneo, 1946

Species of beetle

Abacetus elongellus is a species of ground beetle in the subfamily Pterostichinae. It was described by Straneo in 1946.
