= Abacetus maculatus =

Scientific classification
- Kingdom: Animalia
- Phylum: Arthropoda
- Class: Insecta
- Order: Coleoptera
- Suborder: Adephaga
- Family: Carabidae
- Genus: Abacetus
- Species: A. maculatus

Binomial name
- Abacetus maculatus Straneo, 1949

Species of beetle

Abacetus maculatus is a species of ground beetle in the subfamily Pterostichinae. It was described by Straneo in 1949.
