= List of poems by Walt Whitman =

This article lists the complete poetic bibliography of American poet Walt Whitman (1819 – 1892), predominantly consisting of his poetry collection Leaves of Grass, in addition to periodical pieces that were never published in the aforementioned volume.

== List ==
Poems by Walt Whitman
Title	Index of First Line	Class	Date Published
"Going Somewhere"	" My science-friend, my noblest woman-friend,"	Leaves of Grass (Book XXXIV. Sands at Seventy)	
"The Rounded Catalogue Divine Complete"	" The devilish and the dark, the dying and diseas’d,"	Leaves of Grass (Book XXXV. Good-bye my Fancy)	
A Boston Ballad [1854]	" To get betimes in Boston town I rose this morning early,"	Leaves of Grass (Book XX. By the Roadside)	1855
A Broadway Pageant	" Over the Western sea hither from Niphon come,"	Leaves of Grass (Book XVIII.); The Patriotic Poems III (Poems of America)	
A Carol Closing Sixty-Nine	" A carol closing sixty-nine—a resume—a repetition,"	Leaves of Grass (Book XXXIV. Sands at Seventy)	
A Child's Amaze	" Silent and amazed even when a little boy,"	Leaves of Grass (Book XX. By the Roadside)	
A Christmas Greeting	" Welcome, Brazilian brother—thy ample place is ready;"	Leaves of Grass (Book XXXV. Good-bye my Fancy)	
A Clear Midnight	" This is thy hour O Soul, thy free flight into the wordless,"	Leaves of Grass (Book XXXII. From Noon to Starry Night)	1881
A Farm Picture	" Through the ample open door of the peaceful country barn,"	Leaves of Grass (Book XX. By the Roadside)	1865
A Font of Type	" This latent mine—these unlaunch’d voices—passionate powers,"	Leaves of Grass (Book XXXIV. Sands at Seventy)	
A Glimpse	" A glimpse through an interstice caught,"	Leaves of Grass (Book V. Calamus)	1860
A Hand-Mirror	" Hold it up sternly—see this it sends back, (who is it? is it you?)"	Leaves of Grass (Book XX. By the Roadside)	1860
A Leaf for Hand in Hand	" A leaf for hand in hand;"	Leaves of Grass (Book V. Calamus)	
A March in the Ranks Hard-Prest, and the Road Unknown	" A march in the ranks hard-prest, and the road unknown,"	Leaves of Grass (Book XXI. Drum-Taps); The Patriotic Poems I (Poems of War)	1865
A Noiseless Patient Spider	" A noiseless patient spider,"	Leaves of Grass (Book XXX. Whispers of Heavenly Death)	1871
A Paumanok Picture	" Two boats with nets lying off the sea-beach, quite still,"	Leaves of Grass (Book XXXI.)	
A Persian Lesson	" For his o’erarching and last lesson the greybeard sufi,"	Leaves of Grass (Book XXXV. Good-bye my Fancy)	
A Prairie Sunset	" Shot gold, maroon and violet, dazzling silver, emerald, fawn,"	Leaves of Grass (Book XXXIV. Sands at Seventy)	
A Promise to California	" A promise to California,"	Leaves of Grass (Book V. Calamus)	
A Riddle Song	" That which eludes this verse and any verse,"	Leaves of Grass (Book XXXII. From Noon to Starry Night)	
A Sight in Camp in the Daybreak Gray and Dim	" A sight in camp in the daybreak gray and dim,"	Leaves of Grass (Book XXI. Drum-Taps); The Patriotic Poems I (Poems of War);	1865
A Song for Occupations	" A song for occupations!"	Leaves of Grass (Book XV.)	1855
A Song of Joys	" O to make the most jubilant song!"	Leaves of Grass (Book XI.)	
A Song of the Rolling Earth	" A song of the rolling earth, and of words according,"	Leaves of Grass (Book XVI.)	1856
A Twilight Song	" As I sit in twilight late alone by the flickering oak-flame,:	Leaves of Grass (Book XXXV. Good-bye my Fancy); The Patriotic Poems I (Poems of War)	
A Voice from Death	" A voice from Death, solemn and strange, in all his sweep and power,"	Leaves of Grass (Book XXXV. Good-bye my Fancy)	
A Woman Waits for Me	" A woman waits for me, she contains all, nothing is lacking,"	Leaves of Grass (Book IV. Children of Adam.)	1856
Aboard at a Ship's Helm	" Aboard at a ship's helm,"	Leaves of Grass (Book XIX. Sea-Drift)	
Abraham Lincoln, Born Feb. 12, 1809	" To-day, from each and all, a breath of prayer—a pulse of thought,"	Leaves of Grass (Book XXXIV. Sands at Seventy)	1888, February 12
Adieu to a Soldier	" Adieu O soldier,"	Leaves of Grass (Book XXI. Drum-Taps); The Patriotic Poems I (Poems of War);	
After the Dazzle of Day	" After the Dazzle of Day"	Leaves of Grass (Book XXXIV. Sands at Seventy)	1888, February 3
After the Sea-Ship	" After the sea-ship, after the whistling winds,"	Leaves of Grass (Book XIX. Sea-Drift)	
After the Supper and Talk	" After the supper and talk—after the day is done,"	Leaves of Grass (Book XXXIV. Sands at Seventy)	
Ages and Ages Returning at Intervals	" Ages and ages returning at intervals,"	Leaves of Grass (Book IV. Children of Adam.)	
Ah Poverties, Wincings, and Sulky Retreats	" Ah poverties, wincings, and sulky retreats,"	Leaves of Grass (Book XXXII. From Noon to Starry Night)	
Ah, Not This Granite Dead and Cold	" Ah, Not This Granite Dead and Cold"	Periodical	1885, February
All Is Truth	" O me, man of slack faith so long,"	Leaves of Grass (Book XXXII. From Noon to Starry Night)	
Ambition	" One day, an obscure youth, a wanderer,"	Periodical	1842, January 29
America	" Centre of equal daughters, equal sons,"	Leaves of Grass (Book XXXIV. Sands at Seventy); The Patriotic Poems	1888, February 11
Among the Multitude	" Among the men and women the multitude,"	Leaves of Grass (Book V. Calamus)	1860
An Army Corps on the March	" With its cloud of skirmishers in advance,"	Leaves of Grass (Book XXI. Drum-Taps)	1865-66
An Ended Day	" The soothing sanity and blitheness of completion,"	Leaves of Grass (Book XXXV. Good-bye my Fancy)	
An Evening Lull	" After a week of physical anguish,"	Leaves of Grass (Book XXXIV. Sands at Seventy)	
Apostroph	" O mater! O fils!"	Leaves of Grass	
Apparitions	" A vague mist hanging ’round half the pages:"	Leaves of Grass (Book XXXV. Good-bye my Fancy)	
Are You the New Person Drawn Toward Me?	" Are you the new person drawn toward me?"	Leaves of Grass (Book V. Calamus)	1860
As Adam Early in the Morning	" As Adam early in the morning,"	Leaves of Grass (Book IV. Children of Adam.)	1860
As at Thy Portals Also Death	" As at thy portals also death,"	Leaves of Grass (Book XXXIII. Songs of Parting)	
As Consequent, Etc.	" As consequent from store of summer rains,"	Leaves of Grass (Book XXIV. Autumn Rivulets)	
As I Ebb'd with the Ocean of Life	" As I ebbed with an ebb of the ocean of life,"	Leaves of Grass (Book XIX. Sea-Drift)	1860, April
As I Lay With My Head in Your Lap Camerado.	" As I lay with my head in your lap camerado,"	Leaves of Grass (Book XXI. Drum-Taps)	1865-66
As I Ponder'd in Silence	" As I ponder’d in silence,"	Leaves of Grass (Book I. Inscriptions)	
As I Sit Writing Here	" As I sit writing here, sick and grown old,"	Leaves of Grass (Book XXXIV. Sands at Seventy)	1888, May 14
As I Walk These Broad Majestic Days	" As I walk these broad majestic days of peace,"	Leaves of Grass (Book XXXII. From Noon to Starry Night); The Patriotic Poems IV (Poems of Democracy)	
As I Watch the Ploughman Ploughing	" As I watch’d the ploughman ploughing,"	Leaves of Grass (Book XXX. Whispers of Heavenly Death)	
As If a Phantom Caress'd Me	" As if a phantom caress’d me,"	Leaves of Grass (Book XXX. Whispers of Heavenly Death);	
AS one by one withdraw the lofty actors	" AS one by one withdraw the lofty actors"	Periodical	1885, May 16
As the Greek's Signal Flame	" As the Greek's signal flame, by antique records told"	Leaves of Grass (Book XXXIV. Sands at Seventy)	1887, December 15
As the Time Draws Nigh	" As the time draws nigh glooming a cloud,"	Leaves of Grass (Book XXXIII. Songs of Parting)	
As They Draw to a Close	" As they draw to a close,"	Leaves of Grass (Book XXXIII. Songs of Parting)	
As Toilsome I Wander'd Virginia's Woods	" As toilsome I wander’d Virginia's woods,"	Leaves of Grass (Book XXI. Drum-Taps)	
Ashes of Soldiers	" Ashes of soldiers South or North,"	Leaves of Grass (Book XXXIII. Songs of Parting); The Patriotic Poems II (Poems of After-War)	
Assurances	" I need no assurances, I am a man who is preoccupied of his own soul;"	Leaves of Grass (Book XXX. Whispers of Heavenly Death)	
Bathed in War's Perfume	" BATHED in war's perfume—delicate flag!"	Leaves of Grass (Book XXI. Drum-Taps)	
Beat! Beat! Drums!	" Beat! beat! drums!—Blow! bugles! blow!"	Leaves of Grass (Book XXI. Drum-Taps); The Patriotic Poems I (Poems of War)	1861, September 24
Beautiful Women	" Women sit or move to and fro, some old, some young,"	Leaves of Grass (Book XX. By the Roadside)	
Beginners	" How they are provided for upon the earth, (appearing at intervals,)"	Leaves of Grass (Book I. Inscriptions)	
Beginning My Studies	" Beginning my studies the first step pleas’d me so much,"	Leaves of Grass (Book I. Inscriptions)	
Behavior	" BEHAVIOR--fresh, native, copious, each one for himself or herself,"	Leaves of Grass	
Behold This Swarthy Face	" Behold this swarthy face, these gray eyes,"	Leaves of Grass (Book V. Calamus)	
Bivouac on a Mountain Side	" I see before me now a traveling army halting,"	Leaves of Grass (Book XXI. Drum-Taps)	1865
Bravo, Paris Exposition!	" Add to your show, before you close it, France,"	Leaves of Grass (Book XXXV. Good-bye my Fancy)	
Broadway	" What hurrying human tides, or day or night!"	Leaves of Grass (Book XXXIV. Sands at Seventy)	1888
Brother of All, with Generous Hand	" BROTHER of all, with generous hand,"	Leaves of Grass	
By Blue Ontario's Shore	" By blue Ontario's shore,"	Leaves of Grass (Book XXIII.); The Patriotic Poems IV (Poems of Democracy)	
By Broad Potomac's Shore	" By broad Potomac's shore, again old tongue,"	Leaves of Grass (Book XXXII. From Noon to Starry Night); The Patriotic Poems III (Poems of America)	
By the Bivouac's Fitful Flame	" By the bivouac's fitful flame,"	Leaves of Grass (Book XXI. Drum-Taps)	1865
Camps of Green	" Nor alone those camps of white, old comrades of the wars,"	Leaves of Grass (Book XXXIII. Songs of Parting)	
Cavalry Crossing a Ford	" A line in long array where they wind betwixt green islands,"	Leaves of Grass (Book XXI. Drum-Taps)	1865
Chanting the Square Deific	" Chanting the square deific, out of the One advancing, out of the sides,"	Leaves of Grass (Book XXX. Whispers of Heavenly Death)	1865-6
City of Orgies	" City of orgies, walks and joys,"	Leaves of Grass (Book V. Calamus)	1860
City of Ships	" City of ships!"	Leaves of Grass (Book XXI. Drum-Taps); The Patriotic Poems I (Poems of War)	
Come Up from the Fields Father	" Come up from the fields father, here's a letter from our Pete,"	Leaves of Grass (Book XXI. Drum-Taps); The Patriotic Poems I (Poems of War)	1865
Continuities	" Nothing is ever really lost, or can be lost,"	Leaves of Grass (Book XXXIV. Sands at Seventy)	
Crossing Brooklyn Ferry	" Flood-tide below me! I see you face to face!"	Leaves of Grass (Book VIII.)	1856
Darest Thou Now O Soul	" Darest thou now O soul,"	Leaves of Grass (Book XXX. Whispers of Heavenly Death)	
Death of General Grant	" As one by one withdraw the lofty actors,"	Leaves of Grass (Book XXXIV. Sands at Seventy)	
Debris	" HE is wisest who has the most caution,"	Leaves of Grass	
Delicate Cluster	" Delicate cluster! flag of teeming life!"	Leaves of Grass (Book XXI. Drum-Taps); The Patriotic Poems I (Poems of War)	
Dirge for Two Veterans	" The last sunbeam"	Leaves of Grass (Book XXI. Drum-Taps); The Patriotic Poems I (Poems of War)	
Earth, My Likeness	" Earth, my likeness,"	Leaves of Grass (Book V. Calamus)	1860
Eidolons	" I met a seer"	Leaves of Grass (Book I. Inscriptions)	
Eighteen Sixty-One	" Arm’d year—year of the struggle,"	Leaves of Grass (Book XXI. Drum-Taps)	1865
Election Day, November, 1884	" If I should need to name, O Western World, your powerfulest scene and show,"	Leaves of Grass (Book XXXIV. Sands at Seventy)	
Ethiopia Saluting the Colors	" Who are you dusky woman, so ancient hardly human,"	Leaves of Grass (Book XXI. Drum-Taps)	1871
Europe [The 72d and 73d Years of These States]	" Suddenly out of its stale and drowsy lair, the lair of slaves,"	Leaves of Grass (Book XX. By the Roadside)	1855
Excelsior	" Who has gone farthest? for I would go farther,"	Leaves of Grass (Book XXXII. From Noon to Starry Night)	
Faces	" Sauntering the pavement or riding the country by-road, faces!"	Leaves of Grass (Book XXXII. From Noon to Starry Night); The Patriotic Poems III (Poems of America)	
Facing West from California's Shores	" Facing west from California's shores,"	Leaves of Grass (Book IV. Children of Adam.)	1860
Fanices at Navesink	" Steaming the northern rapids—(an old St. Lawrence reminiscence,"	Leaves of Grass (Book XXXIV. Sands at Seventy)	
Fast Anchor'd Eternal O Love!	" Fast-anchor’d eternal O love! O woman I love!"	Leaves of Grass (Book V. Calamus)	
First O Songs for a Prelude	" First O songs for a prelude,"	The Patriotic Poems I (Poems of War)	
For Him I Sing	" For him I sing,"	Leaves of Grass (Book I. Inscriptions)	
For You, O Democracy	" Come, I will make the continent indissoluble,"	Leaves of Grass (Book V. Calamus); The Patriotic Poems IV (Poems of Democracy)	1860
France [the 18th Year of these States	" A great year and place"	Leaves of Grass (Book XVII. Birds of Passage)	
From Far Dakota's Canyons [June 25, 1876]	" From far Dakota's canyons,"	Leaves of Grass (Book XXXII. From Noon to Starry Night); The Patriotic Poems I (Poems of War)	
From Montauk Point	" I stand as on some mighty eagle's beak,"	Leaves of Grass (Book XXXIV. Sands at Seventy)	
From My Last Years	" FROM my last years, last thoughts I here bequeath,"	Leaves of Grass	
From Paumanok Starting I Fly Like a Bird	" From Paumanok starting I fly like a bird,"	Leaves of Grass (Book XXI. Drum-Taps)	
From Pent-Up Aching Rivers	" From pent-up aching rivers,"	Leaves of Grass (Book IV. Children of Adam.)	1860
Full of Life Now	" Full of life now, compact, visible,"	Leaves of Grass (Book V. Calamus)	1860
Germs	" Forms, qualities, lives, humanity, language, thoughts,"	Leaves of Grass (Book XX. By the Roadside)	
Give Me the Splendid Silent Sun	" Give me the splendid silent sun with all his beams full-dazzling,"	Leaves of Grass (Book XXI. Drum-Taps); The Patriotic Poems III (Poems of America)	1865
Gliding O'er all	" Gliding o’er all, through all,"	Leaves of Grass (Book XX. By the Roadside)	
Gods	" Lover divine and perfect Comrade,"	Leaves of Grass (Book XX. By the Roadside)	1871
Good-Bye My Fancy	" Good-bye my fancy—(I had a word to say,"	Leaves of Grass (Book XXXV. Good-bye my Fancy)	
Good-Bye My Fancy!	" Good-bye my Fancy!"	Leaves of Grass (Book XXXV. Good-bye my Fancy)	1891
Grand Is the Seen	" Grand is the seen, the light, to me—grand are the sky and stars,"	Leaves of Grass (Book XXXV. Good-bye my Fancy)	
Great are the Myths	" GREAT are the myths—I too delight in them;"	Leaves of Grass	
Halcyon Days	" Not from successful love alone,"	Leaves of Grass (Book XXXIV. Sands at Seventy)	
Hast Never Come to Thee an Hour	" Hast never come to thee an hour,"	Leaves of Grass (Book XX. By the Roadside)	
Here the Frailest Leaves of Me	" Here the frailest leaves of me and yet my strongest lasting,"	Leaves of Grass (Book V. Calamus)	1860
Hours Continuing Long	" HOURS continuing long, sore and heavy-hearted,"	Leaves of Grass (Book V: Calamus)	
How Solemn As One by One [Washington City, 1865]	" How solemn as one by one,"	Leaves of Grass (Book XXI. Drum-Taps); The Patriotic Poems II (Poems of After-War)	
Hush'd Be the Camps To-Day [May 4, 1865]	" Hush’d be the camps to-day,"	Leaves of Grass (Book XXII. Memories of President Lincoln); The Patriotic Poems II (Poems of After-War)	
I Am He That Aches with Love	" I am he that aches with amorous love;"	Leaves of Grass (Book IV. Children of Adam.)	
I Dream'd in a Dream	" I dream’d in a dream I saw a city invincible to the attacks of the"	Leaves of Grass (Book V. Calamus)	1860
I Hear America Singing	" I hear America singing, the varied carols I hear,"	Leaves of Grass (Book I. Inscriptions); The Patriotic Poems III (Poems of America)	1860
I Hear It Was Charged Against Me	" I hear it was charged against me that I sought to destroy institutions,"	Leaves of Grass (Book V. Calamus)	1860
I Heard You Solemn-Sweet Pipes of the Organ	" I heard you solemn-sweet pipes of the organ as last Sunday morn I"	Leaves of Grass (Book IV. Children of Adam.)	1865-6
I Saw in Louisiana a Live-Oak Growing	" I saw in Louisiana a live-oak growing,"	Leaves of Grass (Book V. Calamus)	1860
I Saw Old General at Bay	" I saw old General at bay,"	Leaves of Grass (Book XXI. Drum-Taps)	
I Sing the Body Electric	" I sing the body electric,"	Leaves of Grass (Book IV. Children of Adam.)	1855
I Sit and Look Out	" I sit and look out upon all the sorrows of the world, and upon all"	Leaves of Grass (Book XX. By the Roadside)	
I Was Looking a Long While	" I was looking a long while for Intentions,"	Leaves of Grass (Book XXIV. Autumn Rivulets)	
In Cabin'd Ships at Sea	" In cabin’d ships at sea,"	Leaves of Grass (Book I. Inscriptions)	
In Former Songs	"I N former songs Pride have I sung, and Love, and passionate, joyful"	Leaves of Grass	
In Paths Untrodden	" In paths untrodden,"	Leaves of Grass (Book V. Calamus)	1860
In the New Garden in all the Parts	" IN the new garden, in all the parts,"	Leaves of Grass	
Interpolation Sounds	" Over and through the burial chant,"	Leaves of Grass (Book XXXV. Good-bye my Fancy)	
Joy, Shipmate, Joy!	" Joy, shipmate, Joy!"	Leaves of Grass (Book XXXIII. Songs of Parting)	1871
Kosmos	" Who includes diversity and is Nature,"	Leaves of Grass (Book XXIV. Autumn Rivulets)	
L. of G.'s Purport	" Not to exclude or demarcate, or pick out evils from their formidable"	Leaves of Grass (Book XXXV. Good-bye my Fancy)	
Laws for Creations	" Laws for creations,"	Leaves of Grass (Book XXIV. Autumn Rivulets)	1860
Lessons	" THERE are who teach only the sweet lessons of peace and safety;"	Leaves of Grass	
Life	" Ever the undiscouraged, resolute, struggling soul of man;"	Leaves of Grass (Book XXXIV. Sands at Seventy)	
Life and Death	" The two old, simple problems ever intertwined,"	Leaves of Grass (Book XXXIV. Sands at Seventy)	
Lingering Last Drops	" And whence and why come you?"	Leaves of Grass (Book XXXV. Good-bye my Fancy)	
Lo, Victress on the Peaks	" Lo, Victress on the peaks,:	Leaves of Grass (Book XXI. Drum-Taps)	
Locations and Times	" Locations and times—what is it in me that meets them all, whenever"	Leaves of Grass (Book XX. By the Roadside)	
Long I Thought that Knowledge	" LONG I thought that knowledge alone would suffice me—O if I could but obtain knowledge!"	Leaves of Grass	1860
Long, Long Hence	" After a long, long course, hundreds of years, denials,"	Leaves of Grass (Book XXXV. Good-bye my Fancy)	
Long, Too Long America	" Long, too long America,"	Leaves of Grass (Book XXI. Drum-Taps); The Patriotic Poems I (Poems of War)	
Look Down Fair Moon	" Look down fair moon and bathe this scene,"	Leaves of Grass (Book XXI. Drum-Taps)	
Mannahatta	" I was asking for something specific and perfect for my city,"	Leaves of Grass (Book XXXII. From Noon to Starry Night)	
Mannahatta	" My city's fit and noble name resumed,"	Leaves of Grass (Book XXXIV. Sands at Seventy)	
Me Imperturbe	" Me imperturbe, standing at ease in Nature,"	Leaves of Grass (Book I. Inscriptions)	1860
Mediums	" They shall arise in the States,"	Leaves of Grass (Book XXXII. From Noon to Starry Night)	
Memories	" How sweet the silent backward tracings!"	Leaves of Grass (Book XXXIV. Sands at Seventy)	
Miracles	" Why, who makes much of a miracle?"	Leaves of Grass (Book XXIV. Autumn Rivulets)	
Mirages	" More experiences and sights, stranger, than you'd think for;"	Leaves of Grass (Book XXXV. Good-bye my Fancy)	
Mother and Babe	" I see the sleeping babe nestling the breast of its mother,"	Leaves of Grass (Book XX. By the Roadside)	
MY 71st Year	" After surmounting three-score and ten,"	Leaves of Grass (Book XXXV. Good-bye my Fancy)	
My Canary Bird	" Did we count great, O soul, to penetrate the themes of mighty books,"	Leaves of Grass (Book XXXIV. Sands at Seventy)	
My Legacy	" The business man the acquirer vast, "	Leaves of Grass (Book XXXIII. Songs of Parting)	
My Picture-Gallery	" In a little house keep I pictures suspended, it is not a fix’d house,"	Leaves of Grass (Book XXIV. Autumn Rivulets)	1870, January
Myself and Mine	" Myself and mine gymnastic ever,"	Leaves of Grass (Book XVII. Birds of Passage)	
Native Moments	" Native moments—when you come upon me—ah you are here now,"	Leaves of Grass (Book IV. Children of Adam.)	1860
Night on the Prairies	" Night on the prairies,"	Leaves of Grass (Book XXX. Whispers of Heavenly Death)	
No Labor-Saving Machine	" No labor-saving machine,"	Leaves of Grass (Book V. Calamus)	
Not Heat Flames Up and Consumes	" Not heat flames up and consumes,"	Leaves of Grass (Book V. Calamus)	1860
Not Heaving from My Ribb'd Breast Only	" Not heaving from my ribb’d breast only,"	Leaves of Grass (Book V. Calamus)	
Not Meagre, Latent Boughs Alone	" Not heaving from my ribb’d breast only,"	Leaves of Grass (Book XXXIV. Sands at Seventy)	
Not My Enemies Ever Invade Me	" NOT my enemies ever invade me—no harm to my pride from"	Leaves of Grass	1855
Not the Pilot	" Not the pilot has charged himself to bring his ship into port,"	Leaves of Grass (Book XXI. Drum-Taps)	
Not Youth Pertains to Me	" Not youth pertains to me,"	Leaves of Grass (Book XXI. Drum-Taps)	
Now Finale to the Shore	" Now finale to the shore,"	Leaves of Grass (Book XXXIII. Songs of Parting)	1860
Now Precedent Songs, Farewell	" Now precedent songs, farewell—by every name farewell,"	Leaves of Grass (Book XXXIV. Sands at Seventy)	
O Bitter Sprig! Confession Sprig!	" O BITTER sprig! Confession sprig!'	Leaves of Grass	
O Captain! My Captain!	" O Captain! my Captain! our fearful trip is done,"	Leaves of Grass (Book XXII. Memories of President Lincoln); The Patriotic Poems II (Poems of After-War)	1865-6
O Hymen! O Hymenee!	" O hymen! O hymenee! why do you tantalize me thus?"	Leaves of Grass (Book IV. Children of Adam.)	
O Living Always, Always Dying	" O living always, always dying!"	Leaves of Grass (Book XXX. Whispers of Heavenly Death)	
O Magnet-South	" O magnet-south! O glistening perfumed South! my South!"	Leaves of Grass (Book XXXII. From Noon to Starry Night); The Patriotic Poems III (Poems of America)	1860
O Me! O Life!	" O me! O life! of the questions of these recurring,"	Leaves of Grass (Book XX. By the Roadside)	
O Star of France [1870-71]	" O star of France,"	Leaves of Grass (Book XXIV. Autumn Rivulets); The Patriotic Poems IV (Poems of Democracy)	
O Sun of Real Peace	" O SUN of real peace! O hastening light!"	Leaves of Grass	
O Tan-Faced Prairie-Boy	" O tan-faced prairie-boy,"	Leaves of Grass (Book XXI. Drum-Taps)	
O You Whom I Often and Silently Come	" O you whom I often and silently come where you are that I may be with you,"	Leaves of Grass (Book V. Calamus)	1860
Of Him I Love Day and Night	" Of him I love day and night I dream’d I heard he was dead,"	Leaves of Grass (Book XXX. Whispers of Heavenly Death)	
Of That Blithe Throat of Thine	" Of that blithe throat of thine from arctic bleak and blank,"	Leaves of Grass (Book XXXIV. Sands at Seventy)	
Of the Terrible Doubt of Appearances	" Of the terrible doubt of appearances,"	Leaves of Grass (Book V. Calamus)	1860
Of the Visage of Things	" Of the visages of things - And of piercing through to the accepted hells beneath;"	Leaves of Grass	
Offerings	" A thousand perfect men and women appear,"	Leaves of Grass (Book XX. By the Roadside)	
Old Age's Lambent Peaks	" The touch of flame—the illuminating fire—the loftiest look at last,"	Leaves of Grass (Book XXXIV. Sands at Seventy)	
Old Age's Ship & Crafty Death's	" From east and west across the horizon's edge,"	Leaves of Grass (Book XXXV. Good-bye my Fancy)	
Old Chants	" An ancient song, reciting, ending,"	Leaves of Grass (Book XXXV. Good-bye my Fancy)	
Old Ireland	" Far hence amid an isle of wondrous beauty,"	Leaves of Grass (Book XXIV. Autumn Rivulets)	
Old Salt Kossabone	" Far back, related on my mother's side,"	Leaves of Grass (Book XXXIV. Sands at Seventy)	
Old War-Dreams	" In midnight sleep of many a face of anguish,"	Leaves of Grass (Book XXXII. From Noon to Starry Night); The Patriotic Poems I (Poems of War)	1865-6
On Journeys Through the States	" On journeys through the States we start,"	Leaves of Grass (Book I. Inscriptions)	
On the Beach at Night	" On the beach at night,"	Leaves of Grass (Book XIX. Sea-Drift)	1871
On the Beach at Night Alone	" On the beach at night alone,"	Leaves of Grass (Book XIX. Sea-Drift)	
On, on the Same, Ye Jocund Twain!	" On, on the same, ye jocund twain!"	Leaves of Grass (Book XXXV. Good-bye my Fancy)	
Once I Pass'd Through a Populous City	" Once I pass’d through a populous city imprinting my brain for future"	Leaves of Grass (Book IV. Children of Adam.)	1860
One Hour to Madness and Joy	" One hour to madness and joy! O furious! O confine me not!"	Leaves of Grass (Book IV. Children of Adam.)	
One Sweeps By	" ONE sweeps by, attended by an immense train,"	Leaves of Grass	
One's-Self I Sing	" One's-self I sing, a simple separate person,"	Leaves of Grass (Book I. Inscriptions)	1867
Orange Buds by Mail from Florida	" A lesser proof than old Voltaire's, yet greater,"	Leaves of Grass (Book XXXIV. Sands at Seventy)	
Osceola	" When his hour for death had come,"	Leaves of Grass (Book XXXV. Good-bye my Fancy)	
Others May Praise What They Like	" Others may praise what they like;"	Leaves of Grass (Book XXIV. Autumn Rivulets)	1855
Our Old Feuillage	" Always our old feuillage!"	Leaves of Grass (Book X.); The Patriotic Poems III (Poems of America)	
Out from Behind This Mask [To Confront a Portrait]	" Out from behind this bending rough-cut mask,"	Leaves of Grass (Book XXIV. Autumn Rivulets)	
Out of May's Shows Selected	" Apple orchards, the trees all cover’d with blossoms;"	Leaves of Grass (Book XXXIV. Sands at Seventy)	
Out of the Cradle Endlessly Rocking	" Out of the cradle endlessly rocking,"	Leaves of Grass (Book XIX. Sea-Drift)	
Out of the Rolling Ocean the Crowd	" Out of the rolling ocean the crowd came a drop gently to me,"	Leaves of Grass (Book IV. Children of Adam.)	1865
Outlines for a Tomb [G. P., Buried 1870]	" What may we chant, O thou within this tomb?"	Leaves of Grass (Book XXIV. Autumn Rivulets)	
Over the Carnage Rose Prophetic a Voice.	" Over the carnage rose prophetic a voice,"	Leaves of Grass (Book XXI. Drum-Taps)	1865
Passage to India	" Singing my days,"	Leaves of Grass (Book XXVI.)	1871
Patroling Barnegat	" Wild, wild the storm, and the sea high running,"	Leaves of Grass (Book XIX. Sea-Drift)	
Paumanok	" Sea-beauty! stretch’d and basking!"	Leaves of Grass (Book XXXIV. Sands at Seventy)	
Pensive and Faltering	" Pensive and faltering,"	Leaves of Grass (Book XXX. Whispers of Heavenly Death)	
Pensive on Her Dead Gazing	" Pensive on her dead gazing I heard the Mother of All,"	Leaves of Grass (Book XXXIII. Songs of Parting); The Patriotic Poems II (Poems of After-War)	
Perfections	" Only themselves understand themselves and the like of themselves,"	Leaves of Grass (Book XX. By the Roadside)	
Pioneers! O Pioneers!	" Come my tan-faced children"	Leaves of Grass (Book XVII. Birds of Passage); The Patriotic Poems III (Poems of America)	1856
Poem of Remembrance for a Girl or a Boy	" YOU just maturing youth! You male or female!"	Leaves of Grass	
Poets to Come	" Poets to come! orators, singers, musicians to come!"	Leaves of Grass (Book I. Inscriptions)	
Portals	" What are those of the known but to ascend and enter the Unknown?"	Leaves of Grass (Book XXXIII. Songs of Parting)	
Prayer of Columbus	" A batter’d, wreck’d old man,"	Leaves of Grass (Book XXVII.)	1876
Primeval my Love for the Woman I Love	" PRIMEVAL my love for the woman I love,"	Leaves of Grass	
Proud Music of the Storm	" Proud music of the storm,"	Leaves of Grass (Book XXV.)	1871
Queries to My Seventieth Year	" Approaching, nearing, curious,"	Leaves of Grass (Book XXXIV. Sands at Seventy)	
Quicksand Years	" Approaching, nearing, curious,"	Leaves of Grass (Book XXX. Whispers of Heavenly Death)	
Race of Veterans	" Race of veterans—race of victors!"	Leaves of Grass (Book XXI. Drum-Taps)	
Reconciliation	" Word over all, beautiful as the sky,"	Leaves of Grass (Book XXI. Drum-Taps)	1865-6
Recorders Ages Hence	" Recorders ages hence,"	Leaves of Grass (Book V. Calamus)	1860
Red Jacket (From Aloft)	" Upon this scene, this show,"	Leaves of Grass (Book XXXIV. Sands at Seventy)	
Respondez!	" RESPONDEZ! Respondez! "	Leaves of Grass	
Reversals	" Let that which stood in front go behind,"	Leaves of Grass (Book XXIII.)	
Rise O Days from Your Fathomless Deeps	" Rise O days from your fathomless deeps, till you loftier, fiercer sweep,"	Leaves of Grass (Book XXI. Drum-Taps); The Patriotic Poems Epilogue	
Roaming in Thought [After reading Hegel]	" Roaming in thought over the Universe, I saw the little that is Good"	Leaves of Grass (Book XX. By the Roadside)	
Roots and Leaves Themselves Alone	" Roots and leaves themselves alone are these,"	Leaves of Grass (Book V. Calamus)	1860
Sail out for Good, Eidolon Yacht!	" Heave the anchor short!"	Leaves of Grass (Book XXXV. Good-bye my Fancy)	
Salut au Monde!	" O take my hand Walt Whitman!"	Leaves of Grass (Book VI.)	
Savantism	" Thither as I look I see each result and glory retracing itself and"	Leaves of Grass (Book I. Inscriptions)	
Says	" I SAY whatever tastes sweet to the most perfect person that is finally right:	Leaves of Grass	
Scented Herbage of My Breast	" Scented herbage of my breast,"	Leaves of Grass (Book V. Calamus)	1860
Shakspere-Bacon's Cipher	" I doubt it not—then more, far more;"	Leaves of Grass (Book XXXV. Good-bye my Fancy)	
Shut Not Your Doors	" Shut not your doors to me proud libraries,"	Leaves of Grass (Book I. Inscriptions)	1865
Small the Theme of My Chant	" Small the theme of my Chant, yet the greatest—namely, One's-Self—"	Leaves of Grass (Book XXXIV. Sands at Seventy)	
So Far and So Far, and on Toward the End	" SO far, and so far, and on toward the end,"	Leaves of Grass	
So Long!	" My city's fit and noble name resumed,"	Leaves of Grass (Book XXXIII. Songs of Parting)	
Solid, Ironical, Rolling Orb	" SOLID, ironical, rolling orb!"	Leaves of Grass	
Sometimes with One I Love	" Sometimes with one I love I fill myself with rage for fear I effuse"	Leaves of Grass (Book V. Calamus)	1860
Song at Sunset	" Splendor of ended day floating and filling me,"	Leaves of Grass (Book XXXIII. Songs of Parting)	
Song for All Seas, All Ships	" To-day a rude brief recitative,"	Leaves of Grass (Book XIX. Sea-Drift)	
Song of Myself	" I celebrate myself, and sing myself,"	Leaves of Grass (Book III.)	1855
Song of Prudence	" Manhattan's streets I saunter’d pondering,"	Leaves of Grass (Book XXIV. Autumn Rivulets)	
Song of the Answerer	" Now list to my morning's romanza, I tell the signs of the Answerer,"	Leaves of Grass (Book IX.)	1855
Song of the Banner at Daybreak	" O A new song, a free song,"	Leaves of Grass (Book XXI. Drum-Taps); The Patriotic Poems I (Poems of War)	
Song of the Broad-Axe	" Weapon shapely, naked, wan,"	Leaves of Grass (Book XII.); The Patriotic Poems III (Poems of America)	
Song of the Exposition	" (Ah little recks the laborer,"	Leaves of Grass (Book XIII.)	1871, September 7
Song of the Open Road	" Afoot and light-hearted I take to the open road,"	Leaves of Grass (Book VII.)	1856
Song of the Redwood-Tree	" A California song,"	Leaves of Grass (Book XIV.)	
Song of the Universal	" Come said the Muse,"	Leaves of Grass (Book XVII. Birds of Passage)	
Soon Shall the Winter's Foil Be Here	" Soon shall the winter's foil be here;"	Leaves of Grass (Book XXXIV. Sands at Seventy)	
Sounds of the Winter	" Sounds of the winter too,"	Leaves of Grass (Book XXXV. Good-bye my Fancy)	
Spain, 1873–74	" Out of the murk of heaviest clouds,"	Leaves of Grass (Book XXXII. From Noon to Starry Night)	
Sparkles from the Wheel	" Where the city's ceaseless crowd moves on the livelong day,"	Leaves of Grass (Book XXIV. Autumn Rivulets); The Patriotic Poems II (Poems of After-War)	1871
Spirit That Form’d This Scene.	" Spirit that form’d this scene,"	Leaves of Grass (Book XXXII. From Noon to Starry Night)	
Spirit Whose Work Is Done [Washington City, 1865]	" Spirit whose work is done—spirit of dreadful hours!"	Leaves of Grass (Book XXI. Drum-Taps)	
Spontaneous Me	" Spontaneous me, Nature,"	Leaves of Grass (Book IV. Children of Adam.)	1856
Starting from Paumanok	" Starting from fish-shape Paumanok where I was born,"	Leaves of Grass (Book II.)	1860
Still Though the One I Sing	" Still though the one I sing,'	Leaves of Grass (Book I. Inscriptions)	
Stronger Lessons	" Have you learn’d lessons only of those who admired you, and were"	Leaves of Grass (Book XXXIV. Sands at Seventy)	
Tears	" Tears! tears! tears!"	Leaves of Grass (Book XIX. Sea-Drift)	
Tests	" All submit to them where they sit, inner, secure, unapproachable to"	Leaves of Grass (Book XXIV. Autumn Rivulets)	
Thanks in Old Age	" Thanks in old age—thanks ere I go,"	Leaves of Grass (Book XXXIV. Sands at Seventy)	
That Music Always Round Me	" That music always round me, unceasing, unbeginning, yet long"	Leaves of Grass (Book XXX. Whispers of Heavenly Death)	
That Shadow My Likeness	" That shadow my likeness that goes to and fro seeking a livelihood,"	Leaves of Grass (Book V. Calamus)	1860
The Artilleryman's Vision	" While my wife at my side lies slumbering, and the wars are over long,"	Leaves of Grass (Book XXI. Drum-Taps)	
The Base of All Metaphysics	" And now gentlemen,"	Leaves of Grass (Book V. Calamus)	1871
The Bravest Soldiers	" Brave, brave were the soldiers (high named to-day) who lived through"	Leaves of Grass (Book XXXIV. Sands at Seventy)	
The Calming Thought of All	" That coursing on, whate’er men's speculations,"	Leaves of Grass (Book XXXIV. Sands at Seventy)	
The Centenarian's Story	" Give me your hand old Revolutionary,"	Leaves of Grass (Book XXI. Drum-Taps)	1865
The City Dead-House	" By the city dead-house by the gate,"	Leaves of Grass (Book XXIV. Autumn Rivulets)	1856
The Commonplace	" The commonplace I sing;"	Leaves of Grass (Book XXXV. Good-bye my Fancy)	
The Dalliance of the Eagles	" Skirting the river road, (my forenoon walk, my rest,)"	Leaves of Grass (Book XX. By the Roadside)	1881
The Dead Emperor	" To-day, with bending head and eyes, thou, too, Columbia,'	Leaves of Grass (Book XXXIV. Sands at Seventy)	
The Dead Tenor	" As down the stage again,"	Leaves of Grass (Book XXXIV. Sands at Seventy)	
The Dismantled Ship	" In some unused lagoon, some nameless bay,'	Leaves of Grass (Book XXXIV. Sands at Seventy)	
The Dying Veteran	" Amid these days of order, ease, prosperity,"	Leaves of Grass (Book XXXIV. Sands at Seventy); The Patriotic Poems I (Poems of War)	
The First Dandelion	" Simple and fresh and fair from winter's close emerging,"	Leaves of Grass (Book XXXIV. Sands at Seventy)	
The Last Invocation	" At the last, tenderly,"	Leaves of Grass (Book XXX. Whispers of Heavenly Death)	1871
The Mystic Trumpeter	" Hark, some wild trumpeter, some strange musician,"	Leaves of Grass (Book XXXII. From Noon to Starry Night)	1872
The Ox-Tamer	" In a far-away northern county in the placid pastoral region,"	Leaves of Grass (Book XXIV. Autumn Rivulets)	1876
The Pallid Wreath	" Somehow I cannot let it go yet, funeral though it is,"	Leaves of Grass (Book XXXV. Good-bye my Fancy)	
The Prairie States	" A newer garden of creation, no primal solitude,"	Leaves of Grass (Book XXIV. Autumn Rivulets); The Patriotic Poems III (Poems of America)	
The Prairie-Grass Dividing	" The prairie-grass dividing, its special odor breathing,"	Leaves of Grass (Book V. Calamus)	
The Return of the Heroes	" For the lands and for these passionate days and for myself,'	Leaves of Grass (Book XXIV. Autumn Rivulets); The Patriotic Poems II (Poems of After-War)	1855
The Runner	" On a flat road runs the well-train’d runner,"	Leaves of Grass (Book XX. By the Roadside)	1867
The Ship Starting	" Lo, the unbounded sea,"	Leaves of Grass (Book I. Inscriptions)	
The Singer in the Prison	" O sight of pity, shame and dole!"	Leaves of Grass (Book XXIV. Autumn Rivulets)	
The Sleepers	" I wander all night in my vision,"	Leaves of Grass (Book XXVIII.)	
The Sobbing of the Bells [Midnight, Sept. 19-20, 1881]	" The sobbing of the bells, the sudden death-news everywhere,"	Leaves of Grass (Book XXXIII. Songs of Parting)	
The Torch	" On my Northwest coast in the midst of the night a fishermen's group"	Leaves of Grass (Book XXIV. Autumn Rivulets)	
The Unexpress'd	" How dare one say it?"	Leaves of Grass (Book XXXV. Good-bye my Fancy)	
The United States to Old World Critics	" Here first the duties of to-day, the lessons of the concrete,"	Leaves of Grass (Book XXXIV. Sands at Seventy); The Patriotic Poems IV (Poems of Democracy)	
The Untold Want	" The untold want by life and land ne’er granted,"	Leaves of Grass (Book XXXIII. Songs of Parting)	
The Voice of the Rain	" And who art thou? said I to the soft-falling shower,"	Leaves of Grass (Book XXXIV. Sands at Seventy)	
The Wallabout Martyrs	" Greater than memory of Achilles or Ulysses,"	Leaves of Grass (Book XXXIV. Sands at Seventy)	
The World below the Brine	" The world below the brine,"	Leaves of Grass (Book XIX. Sea-Drift)	1860
The Wound-Dresser	" An old man bending I come among new faces,"	Leaves of Grass (Book XXI. Drum-Taps); The Patriotic Poems I (Poems of War)	
There Was a Child Went Forth	" There was a child went forth every day,"	Leaves of Grass (Book XXIV. Autumn Rivulets)	
These Carols	" These carols sung to cheer my passage through the world I see,"	Leaves of Grass (Book XXXIII. Songs of Parting)	
These I Singing in Spring	" These I singing in spring collect for lovers,"	Leaves of Grass (Book V. Calamus)	1860
Thick-Sprinkled Bunting	" Thick-sprinkled bunting! flag of stars!"	Leaves of Grass (Book XXXII. From Noon to Starry Night); The Patriotic Poems I (Poems of War)	
Think of the Soul	" THINK of the Soul;"	Leaves of Grass	
This Compost	" Something startles me where I thought I was safest,"	Leaves of Grass (Book XXIV. Autumn Rivulets)	1856
This Day, O Soul	" THIS day, O soul, I give you a wondrous mirror;"	Leaves of Grass	
This Dust Was Once the Man	" This dust was once the man,"	Leaves of Grass (Book XXII. Memories of President Lincoln)	1855
This Moment Yearning and Thoughtful	" This moment yearning and thoughtful sitting alone,"	Leaves of Grass (Book V. Calamus)	1860
Thou Mother with Thy Equal Brood	" Thou Mother with thy equal brood,"	Leaves of Grass (Book XXXI.); The Patriotic Poems IV (Poems of Democracy)	
Thou Orb Aloft Full-Dazzling	" Thou orb aloft full-dazzling! thou hot October noon!"	Leaves of Grass (Book XXXII. From Noon to Starry Night)	1855
Thou Reader	" Thou reader throbbest life and pride and love the same as I,"	Leaves of Grass (Book I. Inscriptions)	
Thought	" OF what I write from myself—As if that were not the resume"	Leaves of Grass	
Thought	" Of Equality—as if it harm’d me, giving others the same chances and"	Leaves of Grass (Book XX. By the Roadside)	
Thought	" Of justice—as If could be any thing but the same ample law,"	Leaves of Grass (Book XX. By the Roadside)	
Thought	" Of obedience, faith, adhesiveness;"	Leaves of Grass (Book XX. By the Roadside)	1860
Thought	" Of persons arrived at high positions, ceremonies, wealth,"	Leaves of Grass (Book XXIV. Autumn Rivulets)	
Thought	" As I sit with others at a great feast, suddenly while the music is playing,"	Leaves of Grass (Book XXX. Whispers of Heavenly Death)	
Thoughts	" Of ownership—as if one fit to own things could not at pleasure enter"	Leaves of Grass (Book XX. By the Roadside)	
Thoughts	" Of public opinion,"	Leaves of Grass (Book XXXII. From Noon to Starry Night)	
Thoughts	" Of these years I sing,"	Leaves of Grass (Book XXXIII. Songs of Parting); The Patriotic Poems IV (Poems of Democracy)	
To a Certain Cantatrice	" Here, take this gift,"	Leaves of Grass (Book I. Inscriptions)	
To a Certain Civilian	" Did you ask dulcet rhymes from me?"	Leaves of Grass (Book XXI. Drum-Taps); The Patriotic Poems I (Poems of War)	1865
To a Common Prostitute	" Be composed—be at ease with me—I am Walt Whitman, liberal and"	Leaves of Grass (Book XXIV. Autumn Rivulets)	
To a Foil'd European Revolutionaire	" Courage yet, my brother or my sister!"	Leaves of Grass (Book XXIV. Autumn Rivulets)	
To a Historian	" You who celebrate bygones,"	Leaves of Grass (Book I. Inscriptions)	
To a Locomotive in Winter	" Thee for my recitative,"	Leaves of Grass (Book XXXII. From Noon to Starry Night)	1876
To a President	" All you are doing and saying is to America dangled mirages,"	Leaves of Grass (Book XX. By the Roadside)	
To a Pupil	" Is reform needed? is it through you?"	Leaves of Grass (Book XXIV. Autumn Rivulets)	1856
To a Stranger	" Passing stranger! you do not know how longingly I look upon you,"	Leaves of Grass (Book V. Calamus)	1860
To a Western Boy	" Many things to absorb I teach to help you become eleve of mine;"	Leaves of Grass (Book V. Calamus)	1860
To Foreign Lands	" I heard that you ask’d for something to prove this puzzle the New World,"	Leaves of Grass (Book I. Inscriptions); The Patriotic Poems IV (Poems of Democracy)	
To Get the Final Lilt of Songs	" To get the final lilt of songs,"	Leaves of Grass (Book XXXIV. Sands at Seventy)	
To Him That Was Crucified	" My spirit to yours dear brother,"	Leaves of Grass (Book XXIV. Autumn Rivulets)	1860
To Old Age	" I see in you the estuary that enlarges and spreads itself grandly as"	Leaves of Grass (Book XX. By the Roadside)	
To One Shortly to Die	" From all the rest I single out you, having a message for you,"	Leaves of Grass (Book XXX. Whispers of Heavenly Death)	
To Rich Givers	" What you give me I cheerfully accept,"	Leaves of Grass (Book XX. By the Roadside)	
To the East and to the West	" To the East and to the West,"	Leaves of Grass (Book V. Calamus)	
To the Garden of the World	" To the garden the world anew ascending,"	Leaves of Grass (Book IV. Children of Adam.)	
To the Leaven'd Soil They Trod	" To the leaven’d soil they trod calling I sing for the last,"	Leaves of Grass (Book XXI. Drum-Taps)	
To the Man-of-War-Bird	" Thou who hast slept all night upon the storm,"	Leaves of Grass (Book XIX. Sea-Drift)	
To the Pending Year	" Have I no weapon-word for thee—some message brief and fierce?"	Leaves of Grass (Book XXXV. Good-bye my Fancy)	
To the Reader at Parting	" NOW, dearest comrade, lift me to your face,"	Leaves of Grass	
To the States	" To the States or any one of them, or any city of the States, Resist"	Leaves of Grass (Book I. Inscriptions)	
To The States [To Identify the 16th, 17th, or 18th Presidentiad]	" Why reclining, interrogating? why myself and all drowsing?'	Leaves of Grass (Book XX. By the Roadside)	
To the Sun-Set Breeze	" Ah, whispering, something again, unseen,"	Leaves of Grass (Book XXXV. Good-bye my Fancy)	
To Thee Old Cause	" To thee old cause!"	Leaves of Grass (Book I. Inscriptions); The Patriotic Poems IV (Poems of Democracy)	
To Think of Time	" To think of time—of all that retrospection,"	Leaves of Grass (Book XXIX.)	
To Those Who've Fail'd	" Vivas to those who have fail’d!"	Leaves of Grass (Book XXXIV. Sands at Seventy)	
To You	" Stranger, if you passing meet me and desire to speak to me, why"	Leaves of Grass (Book I. Inscriptions)	1860
To You	" Whoever you are, I fear you are walking the walks of dreams,"	Leaves of Grass (Book XVII. Birds of Passage)	1856
To-Day and Thee	" The appointed winners in a long-stretch’d game;"	Leaves of Grass (Book XXXIV. Sands at Seventy)	
Transpositions	" Let the reformers descend from the stands where they are forever"	Leaves of Grass (Book XXVIII.)	1855
Trickle Drops	" Trickle drops! my blue veins leaving!"	Leaves of Grass (Book V. Calamus)	
True Conquerors	" Old farmers, travelers, workmen (no matter how crippled or bent,)"	Leaves of Grass (Book XXXIV. Sands at Seventy)	
Turn O Libertad	" Turn O Libertad, for the war is over,"	Leaves of Grass (Book XXI. Drum-Taps)	
Twenty Years	" Down on the ancient wharf, the sand, I sit, with a new-comer chatting:"	Leaves of Grass (Book XXXIV. Sands at Seventy)	
Twilight	" The soft voluptuous opiate shades,"	Leaves of Grass (Book XXXIV. Sands at Seventy)	
Two Rivulets	" TWO Rivulets side by side,"	Leaves of Grass	
Unfolded out of the Folds	" Unfolded out of the folds of the woman man comes unfolded, and is"	Leaves of Grass (Book XXIV. Autumn Rivulets)	
Unnamed Land	" Nations ten thousand years before these States, and many times ten"	Leaves of Grass (Book XXIV. Autumn Rivulets)	1855
Unseen Buds	" Unseen buds, infinite, hidden well,"	Leaves of Grass (Book XXXV. Good-bye my Fancy)	1891
Vigil Strange I Kept on the Field One Night	" Vigil strange I kept on the field one night;"	Leaves of Grass (Book XXI. Drum-Taps)	1865
Virginia—The West	" The noble sire fallen on evil days,"	Leaves of Grass (Book XXI. Drum-Taps)	1865
Visor'd	" A mask, a perpetual natural disguiser of herself,"	Leaves of Grass (Book XX. By the Roadside)	
Vocalism	" Vocalism, measure, concentration, determination, and the divine"	Leaves of Grass (Book XXIV. Autumn Rivulets)	1860
Wandering at Morn	" Wandering at morn,"	Leaves of Grass (Book XXIV. Autumn Rivulets)	
Warble for Lilac-Time	" Warble me now for joy of lilac-time, (returning in reminiscence,)"	Leaves of Grass (Book XXIV. Autumn Rivulets)	
Washington's Monument February, 1885	" Ah, not this marble, dead and cold:"	Leaves of Grass (Book XXXIV. Sands at Seventy)	
We Two Boys Together Clinging	" We two boys together clinging,"	Leaves of Grass (Book V. Calamus)	1860
We Two, How Long We Were Fool'd	" We two, how long we were fool’d,"	Leaves of Grass (Book IV. Children of Adam.)	
Weave in, My Hardy Life	" Weave in, weave in, my hardy life,"	Leaves of Grass (Book XXXII. From Noon to Starry Night); The Patriotic Poems II (Poems of After-War)	
What Am I After All	" What am I after all but a child, pleas’d with the sound of my own"	Leaves of Grass (Book XXIV. Autumn Rivulets)	
What Best I See in Thee	" What best I see in thee,"	The Patriotic Poems IV (Poems of Democracy)	
What General has a Good Army	" WHAT General has a good army in himself, has a good army;"	Leaves of Grass	
What Place Is Besieged?	" WHAT place is besieged, and vainly tries to raise the siege?"	Leaves of Grass (Book I. Inscriptions)	
What Ship Puzzled at Sea	" What ship puzzled at sea, cons for the true reckoning?"	Leaves of Grass (Book XXX. Whispers of Heavenly Death)	
What Think You I Take My Pen in Hand?	" What think you I take my pen in hand to record?"	Leaves of Grass (Book V. Calamus)	1860
What Weeping Face	" What weeping face is that looking from the window?"	Leaves of Grass	
When I Heard at the Close of the Day	" When I heard at the close of the day how my name had been receiv’d"	Leaves of Grass (Book V. Calamus)	1860
When I heard the Learn'd Astronomer	" When I heard the learn’d astronomer,"	Leaves of Grass (Book XXX. Whispers of Heavenly Death)	1865
When I Peruse the Conquer'd Fame	" When I peruse the conquer’d fame of heroes and the victories of"	Leaves of Grass (Book V. Calamus)	
When I Read the Book	" When I read the book, the biography famous,"	Leaves of Grass (Book I. Inscriptions)	1867
When Lilacs Last in the Dooryard Bloom'd	" When lilacs last in the dooryard bloom’d,"	Leaves of Grass (Book XXII. Memories of President Lincoln); The Patriotic Poems II (Poems of After-War)	1865-66
When the Full-Grown Poet Came	" When the full-grown poet came,":	Leaves of Grass (Book XXXV. Good-bye my Fancy)	
While Not the Past Forgetting	" While not the past forgetting,"	Leaves of Grass (Book XXXIV. Sands at Seventy)	
Whispers of Heavenly Death	" Whispers of heavenly death murmur’d I hear,"	Leaves of Grass (Book XXX. Whispers of Heavenly Death)	
Who is now Reading This?	" May-be one is now reading this who knows some wrong-doing of my past life,"	Leaves of Grass	
Who Learns My Lesson Complete?	" Who learns my lesson complete?"	Leaves of Grass (Book XXIV. Autumn Rivulets)	
Whoever You Are Holding Me Now in Hand	" Whoever you are holding me now in hand,"	Leaves of Grass (Book V. Calamus)	1860
With All Thy Gifts	" With all thy gifts America,"	Leaves of Grass (Book XXIV. Autumn Rivulets)	
With Antecedents	" With antecedents,"	Leaves of Grass (Book XVII. Birds of Passage)	
With Husky-Haughty Lips, O Sea!	" With husky-haughty lips, O sea!"	Leaves of Grass (Book XXXIV. Sands at Seventy)	
World Take Good Notice	" World take good notice, silver stars fading,"	Leaves of Grass (Book XXI. Drum-Taps)	
Year of Meteors [1859-60	" Year of meteors! brooding year!"	Leaves of Grass (Book XVII. Birds of Passage)	
Year That Trembled and Reel'd Beneath Me	" Year that trembled and reel’d beneath me!"	Leaves of Grass (Book XXI. Drum-Taps); The Patriotic Poems I (Poems of War)	1865
Years of the Modern	" Years of the modern! years of the unperform’d!"	Leaves of Grass (Book XXXIII. Songs of Parting); The Patriotic Poems IV (Poems of Democracy)	1865
Yet, Yet, Ye Downcast Hours	" Yet, yet, ye downcast hours, I know ye also,"	Leaves of Grass (Book XXX. Whispers of Heavenly Death)	1860
Yonnondio	" A song, a poem of itself—the word itself a dirge,"	Leaves of Grass (Book XXXIV. Sands at Seventy)	
You Felons on Trial in Courts	" You felons on trial in courts,"	Leaves of Grass (Book XXIV. Autumn Rivulets)	
You Lingering Sparse Leaves of Me	" You lingering sparse leaves of me on winter-nearing boughs,"	Leaves of Grass (Book XXXIV. Sands at Seventy)	
Youth, Day, Old Age and Night	" Youth, large, lusty, loving—youth full of grace, force, fascination,"	Leaves of Grass (Book XVI.)	

== Notes ==
1.[To U. S. G. return’d from his World's Tour]
2.[Written in Platte Canyon, Colorado]
