= The Sleepers (poem) =

Poem by Walt Whitman

"The Sleepers" is a poem by Walt Whitman. The poem was first published in the first edition of Leaves of Grass (1855), but was re-titled and heavily revised several times throughout Whitman's life.

== Background ==
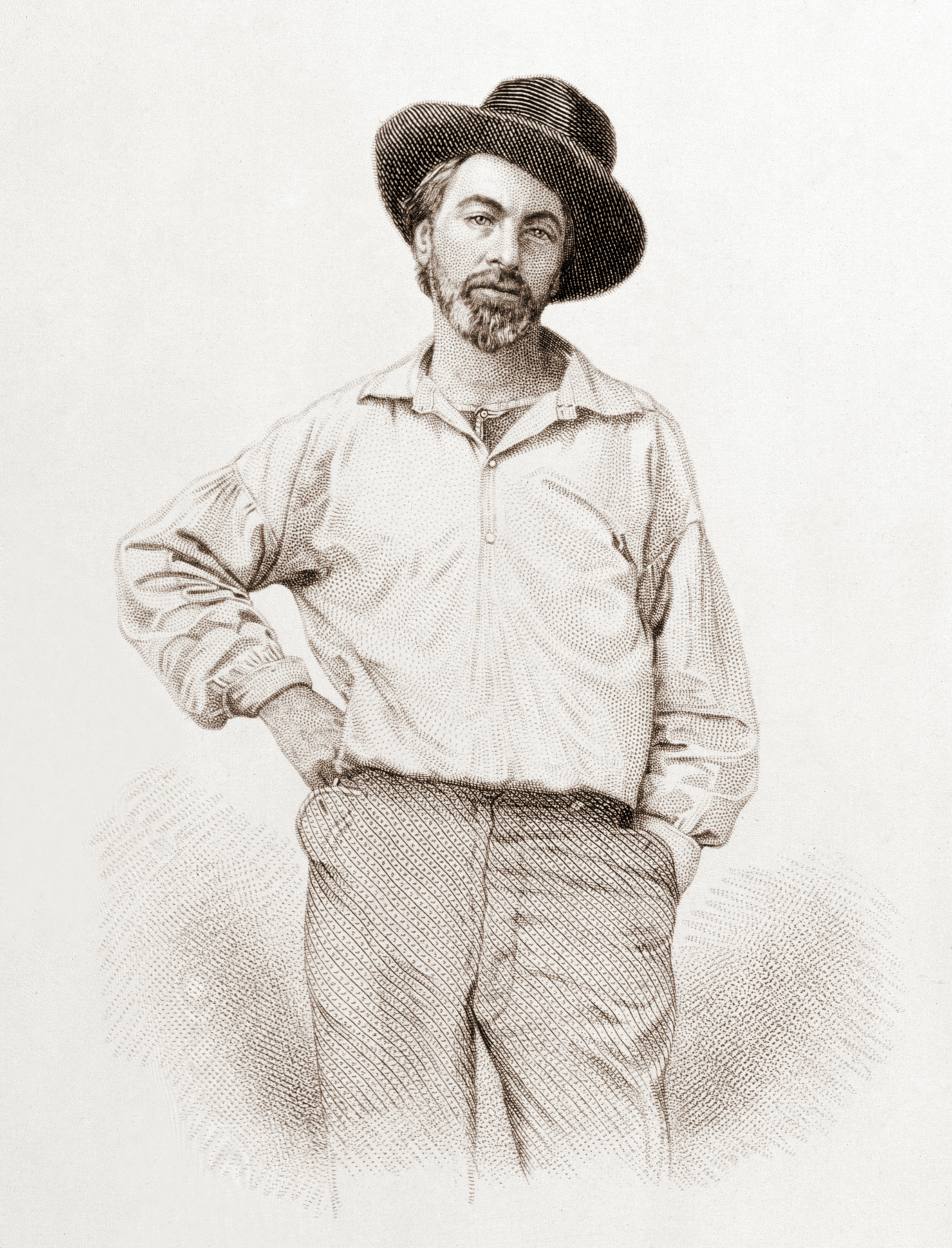
Walt Whitman, age 35, from the frontispiece to Leaves of Grass, Fulton St., Brooklyn, N.Y., steel engraving by Samuel Hollyer from a lost daguerreotype by Gabriel Harrison

The American poet Walt Whitman first published the poetry anthology Leaves of Grass in 1855. He continued to expand, revise, and rewrite poems in the collection until his death in 1892. The Academy of American Poets deemed the collection "possibly the greatest book of American poetry ever written." According to the poet J. D. McClatchy, "No one has been able to adequately describe how Walter Whitman came to write his book."

== Writing and publication ==
Whitman drafted "The Sleepers" in his notebook. The poem is one of the first five written works in Leaves of Grass; others included "Song of Myself", "I Sing the Body Electric". It was one of twelve poems in the first edition of Leaves of Grass. Whitman revised the poem heavily; by the last edition of Leaves of Grass, the poem was changed from its original form to an extent that was unmatched by any other of Whitman's poems. The poem was untitled before 1855, taking the name "I wander all night" from the first line. It took the title "Night Poem" in 1856, "Sleep-Chasings" in 1860, and adopted the title "The Sleepers" in 1871, which it retained.

== Content ==
The poem is a dream vision; the first line reads "I wander all night in my vision". At the beginning of the poem, the narrator is described as "Wandering and confused, lost to myself, ill-assorted, contradictory". In the dream, they travel to various places, visiting people as they are asleep. The poet visits children first, who are described as being still and breathing quietly; French considers them paralyzed, comatose, or dead. Next, they come across various people who are suffering:

The wretched features of ennuyes, the white features of corpses, the livid faces of
drunkards, the sick-gray faces of onanists,
The gash'd bodies on battle-fields, the insane in their strong-door'd rooms, the sacred
idiots, the new-born emerging from gates, and the dying emerging from gates ....

This world is a hellish one, but the narrator soon moves on, focusing on loving groups sleeping before returning to miserable people, such as prisoners and murderers. However, the poem quickly shifts to a more hopeful note:

Now I pierce the darkness, new beings appear,
The earth recedes from me into the night,
I saw that it was beautiful, and I see that what is not the earth is beautiful.

French cites this as a turning point. Shortly before this moment, the narrator feels sympathetic for the suffering of various humans, and he starts to find peace and view the world from a happier light. French suggests that Whitman is making a connection directly between sympathy and truth. After this moment, once "distressed" and "confused" poet becomes excited, happy, and confident. Yet even this happiness is not complete, as the poet remembers miserable people, such as "the exile, the criminal that stood in the box/... the wasted or feeble person". After briefly dwelling on this, the poem has a portion from the point of view of the narrator's lover. In the subsequent sections, the narrator sees death and destruction (in the form of a drowning swimmer, a shipwreck, George Washington's troops being killed at the Battle of Brooklyn) and beauty (as Washington bidding his troops goodbye and a beautiful Native American woman who visits the poet's mother). French considers the native woman to be "at least ideally human" and she is the poem's penultimate section. When she departs, the poem ends in joy, as the narrator sees a vision of a world in "perfect order". The poem ends on a happy note as the narrator views people in better health:

The call of the slave is one with the master's call, and the master salutes the slave,
The felon steps forth from the prison, the insane becomes sane, the suffering of sick persons
is reliev'd,
The sweatings and fevers stop, the throat that was unsound is sound, the lungs of
the consumptive are resumed, the poor distress'd head is free,
The joints of the rheumatic move as smoothly as ever, and smoother than ever,
Stiflings and passages open, the paralyzed become supple,
The swell'd and convuls'd and congested awake to themselves in condition, They pass the invigoration of the night and the chemistry of the night, and awake.

== Reception ==
The poem has gained a reputation as an obscure work. In 1902 John Burroughs said that "The Sleepers" was one of only a few Whitman poems he did not understand. The scholar Jerome Loving deemed "The Sleepers" "the most famous dream in American literature". The Cambridge Introduction to Walt Whitman listed "The Sleepers" as one of Whitman's most famous poems. It goes on to describe the poem as "a particularly distinguished performance" and drew comparisons to "Song of Myself".

== Analysis ==
"The Sleepers" received relatively little critical attention until the later 20th century, when several studies were published. Scholar R. S. Mishra notes that all the seemingly disparate events are in fact united by the night they are viewed in. The historian Alan Trachtenberg wrote that none of the original poems in Leaves of Grass had "so baffled and so intrigued readers" as "The Sleepers." The scholar Michael Rainer called it "perhaps the most startling and modern of the untitled poems" in the first edition of Leaves of Grass.

Analysis of the poem has included using the theories of Carl Jung, viewing the poem in the context of "uroboric incest", which Rainer describes as "the return of the conscious to a pre-conscious state".

=== Revisions ===
Trachtenberg considers Whitman's revisions and retitlings of the poem to show a change in emphasis.

=== Slavery section ===
In the poem, a large, strong black whale is used as a symbol that represents "the destructive power of American slaves in revolt against white society." An early version of the metaphor in Whitman's notebook read:

Beware the Flukes of the whale. He is slow and sleepy—but when he moves, his lightest touch is death. I think he already feels the lance, for he moves a little restlessly. You are great sportsmen, no doubt. What! That black and lethargic mass, my sportsmen, dull and sleepy as it seems, hold the lightning and the taps of thunder. He is slow—O, ong and long and slow and slow—but when he does move, his lightest touch is death

In the metaphor, the "sportsmen" are white people. The sixth section of the poem includes a segment that is written in first person from the point of view of a Black slave, described only as Lucifer's "heir", including the lines:

Now Lucifer was not dead . . . . or if he was I am his sorrowful terrible heir;
I have been wronged . . . . I am oppressed . . . I hate him that oppresses me,
I will either destroy him, or he shall release me.

Lucifer may refer to several different things or people; in 1956, Sholom J. Kahn speculated he may have been a slave trader. Kahn also thinks it possible Lucifer is referencing Satan, or a broader concept of evil. Whitman may have been influenced in the passage by Philip James Bailey's Festus. According to the scholar Christopher Beach, the images of Lucifer and a whale allow a slave to express themselves, though society denies them a voice. Beach calls the phrasing "Now Lucifer was not dead" "one of the most striking moments in all of Whitman's poetry." The section is Whitman's most clear condemnation of slavery and his most clear effort to understand the thoughts of an enslaved person. This passage was unprecedented among white American poets, but was cut in the 1881 Leaves of Grass, for unclear reasons. Whitman wrote no comparable poetry after 1855. Ed Folsom in 2000 called the passage "one of the most powerful and evocative passages about slavery in American literature".

== Bibliography ==
- Beach, Christopher (1996). The politics of distinction : Whitman and the discourses of nineteenth-century America. Athens : University of Georgia Press. ISBN 978-0-8203-1834-9.
- Miller, Matt (2010). Collage of myself: Walt Whitman and the making of Leaves of grass. Lincoln: University of Nebraska Press. ISBN 978-0-8032-3442-0. OCLC 759854072.
- Belasco, Susan; Folsom, Ed; Price, Kenneth M., eds. (2007). Leaves of Grass: the Sesquicentennial Essays. Lincoln: University of Nebraska Press. ISBN 978-0-8032-0878-0. OCLC 182556277.
  - Trachtenberg, Alan (2007). "Whitman at Night: "The Sleepers" in 1855". Leaves of Grass: the Sesquicentennial Essays. Lincoln: University of Nebraska Press. ISBN 978-0-8032-0878-0. OCLC 182556277.
- French, R. (1990-07-01). "Whitman's Dream Vision: A Reading of "The Sleepers"". Walt Whitman Quarterly Review. 8 (1): 1–15. doi:10.13008/2153-3695.1268. ISSN 0737-0679.
- Kahn, Sholom J. (1956). "Whitman's "Black Lucifer": Some Possible Sources". PMLA. 71 (5): 932–944. doi:10.2307/460520. ISSN 0030-8129. JSTOR 460520. S2CID 163314175.
- Killingsworth, M. Jimmie (2007). The Cambridge Introduction to Walt Whitman. Cambridge, UK: Cambridge University Press. ISBN 978-0-511-27529-6. OCLC 153956010.
- Kummings, Donald D., ed. (2006). A Companion to Walt Whitman. Hoboken, New Jersey: John Wiley & Sons. ISBN 978-1-4051-2093-7.
- Rainer, Michael (1983-09-01). "Uroboric Incest in Whitman's "The Sleepers"". Walt Whitman Quarterly Review. 1 (2): 8–13. doi:10.13008/2153-3695.1016. ISSN 0737-0679.
- Whelan, Carol (1992-07-01). ""Do I Contradict Myself?": Progression through Contraries in Walt Whitman's "The Sleepers"". Walt Whitman Quarterly Review. 10 (1): 25–39. doi:10.13008/2153-3695.1351. ISSN 0737-0679.
