= Crossing Brooklyn Ferry =

1856 poem by Walt Whitman

"Crossing Brooklyn Ferry" is a poem by the American poet Walt Whitman. Originally published in 1856 as "Sun-Down Poem", it was retitled "Crossing Brooklyn Ferry" in the 1860 Leaves of Grass collection. As with many of Whitman's early poems, he made minor revisions to it over the years until the final version appeared in the 1881 edition of Leaves of Grass.

The poem describes a ferry-boat trip across the East River from Manhattan to Brooklyn. This was during the decades before the Brooklyn Bridge when ferry-boats frequently traversed that section of the East River as a means of commuting between New York City boroughs. As the poet stands on the boat's deck and vividly conveys the sights and sounds, he has an epiphany when he realizes that all people, even in future generations long after his death, will have the same thoughts and feelings he is experiencing while crossing the river.

== Summary and analysis ==
"Crossing Brooklyn Ferry" consists of nine sections for a total of 132 lines. It is one of Whitman's mid-length poems, "not so sprawling as 'Song of Myself' but with enough space to allow him some musical and thematic amplitude." The poem's timeframe begins a half hour before sunset, and the poet quickly establishes an intimacy with the reader:

Crowds of men and women attired in the usual costumes, how curious you are to me!
On the ferry-boats the hundreds and hundreds that cross, returning home, are more curious to me than you suppose,
And you that shall cross from shore to shore years hence are more to me, and more in my meditations, than you might suppose.

In sections 2 and 3, Whitman employs parallelism and "cataloguing", which are techniques he often used in longer poems to build a cumulative power:

It avails not, time nor place—distance avails not,
I am with you, you men and women of a generation, or ever so many generations hence,
Just as you feel when you look on the river and sky, so I felt,
Just as any of you is one of a living crowd, I was one of a crowd,
Just as you are refresh'd by the gladness of the river and the bright flow, I was refresh'd,
Just as you stand and lean on the rail, yet hurry with the swift current, I stood yet was hurried,
. . .
Watched the Twelfth-month sea-gulls, saw them high in the air floating with motionless wings, oscillating their bodies,
Saw how the glistening yellow lit up parts of their bodies and left the rest in strong shadow,
Saw the slow-wheeling circles and the gradual edging toward the south,
Saw the reflection of the summer sky in the water,

In the middle sections 5 and 6, the poet has a kind of crisis of doubt, expressed in lines such as "I too felt the curious abrupt questionings stir within me", and:

It is not upon you alone the dark patches fall,
The dark threw its patches down upon me also,
The best I had done seem'd to me blank and suspicious,
My great thoughts as I supposed them, were they not in reality meagre?

Section 9 reintroduces the catalogued list of images from section 3, but with "a difference in tone, which derives in part from the imperative mode of the verb that is used throughout to begin the lines, giving them conviction and assurance that they did not have before."

Flow on, river! flow with the flood-tide, and ebb with the ebb-tide!
Frolic on, crested and scallop-edg’d waves!
Gorgeous clouds of the sunset! drench with your splendor me, or the men and women generations after me!
Cross from shore to shore, countless crowds of passengers!

Some critics have suggested that the jubilant conclusion of "Crossing Brooklyn Ferry" represents the poet's "triumphant confrontations with the knowledge of his own death." He has experienced a crisis and a transcendence, elevating what could be a mundane ferry-boat ride into a celebration of the cityscape, the water, the people taking the ferry, humanity in general, and his ability to reach across time to address readers centuries hence.

== Composition and publication history ==
"Crossing Brooklyn Ferry" initially appeared under the title "Sun-Down Poem" in the second edition of Leaves of Grass, published in 1856. The idea for that title may have occurred to Whitman as far back as 1839 in his essays, "Sun-Down Papers, From the Desk of a Schoolmaster". Literary scholars believe he started composing "Crossing Brooklyn Ferry" before the first Leaves of Grass edition went to press in July 1855, since there are lines from the poem in his notebooks from earlier that year.

By the 1860 Leaves of Grass edition, the poem had its present title. In the 1881 Leaves of Grass edition, Whitman placed "Crossing Brooklyn Ferry" third among the twelve poems that followed the "Calamus" cluster. Jerome Loving has called the poem "Whitman's greatest celebration of the transcendentalist unity of existence and is certainly the crown jewel of the 1856 edition."

Whitman was said to have been inspired by the Fulton Ferry and those who rode it for daily commutes before the construction of New York City's network of bridges and tunnels. An excerpt from "Crossing Brooklyn Ferry" is used as an inscription at the Fulton Ferry Landing in Brooklyn Heights where Whitman the passenger would have disembarked. A Brooklyn ice cream maker, Ample Hills, takes its name from a line in the poem: "I too lived, Brooklyn of ample hills was mine."
