= Prayer of Columbus =

Poem by Walt Whitman

"Prayer of Columbus" is a poem written by American poet Walt Whitman. The poem evokes the enterprising spirit of Christopher Columbus in a God-fearing light, who rediscovered the North American continent in 1492, leading to the colonization of the Americas by the emerging European powers. Although the Viking Leif Ericson has generally been credited as having discovered the North American continent roughly 500 years earlier, Columbus' rediscovery has had a more lasting impact on the colonization trends that continued until around the onset of World War I. Thus, Whitman's poem serves as a fitting tribute to the proper explorer.

Whitman first wrote "Prayer of Columbus" in late 1873 before its first publication in the March 1874 issue of Harper's Monthly. It was then published in Two Rivulets in 1876 before being incorporated into the 1881 edition of Leaves of Grass. Scholar Linda Wagner-Martin notes that the poem is "unusually autobiographical" for Whitman, in that it incorporates his own experiences with declining health and aging.

== Legacy ==
Portions of Whitman's "Prayer of Columbus" have been inscribed in gilded letters in the marble wall of the Archives/Navy Memorial metro station in Washington, D.C.

In modern times the poem has been set to music by various composers including Robert Strassburg.
