= Leaves of Grass =

Expansive Walt Whitman poetry collection

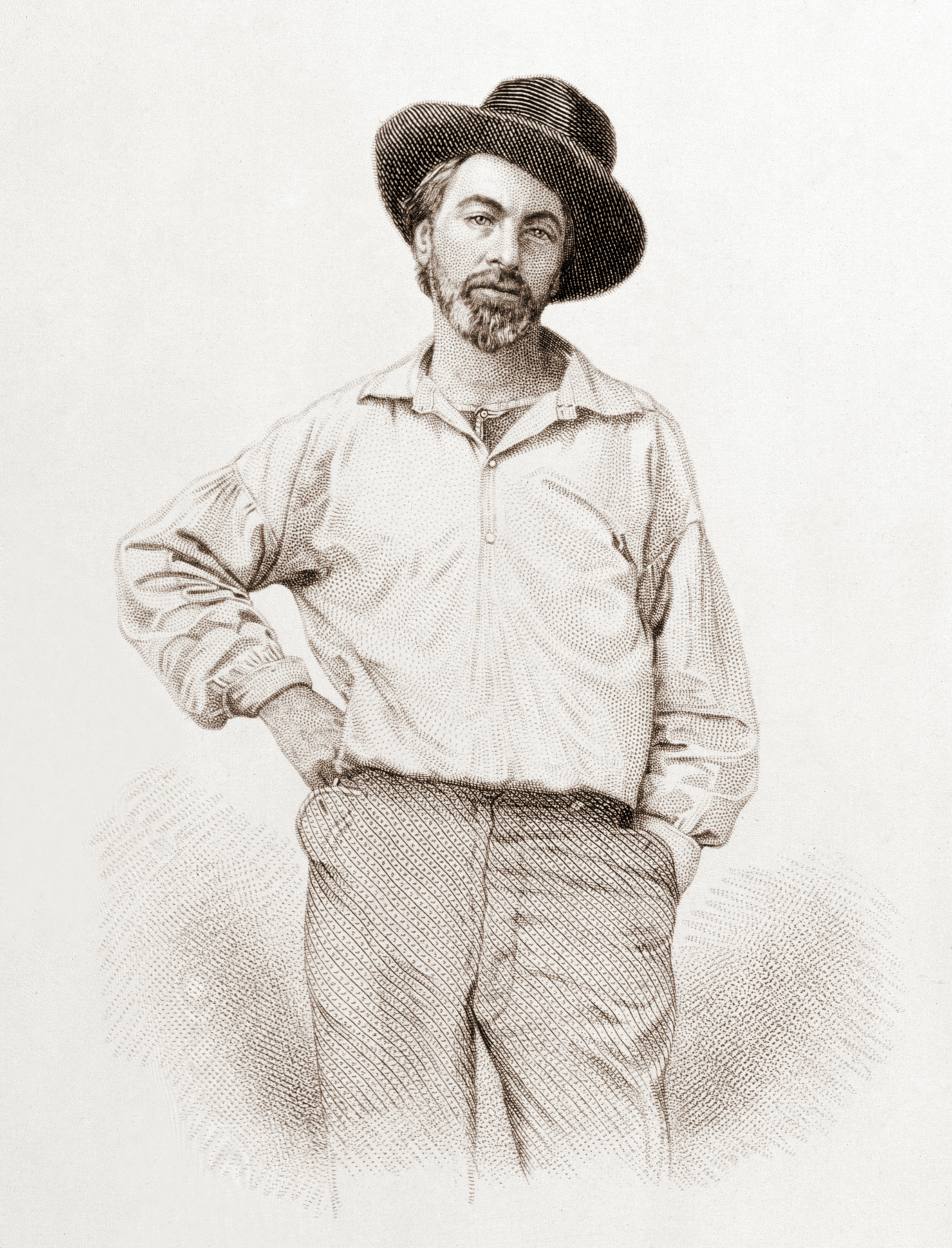
- This steel engraving of Whitman served as the frontispiece to the first edition of Leaves of Grass, published on July 4, 1855
- Author: Walt Whitman
- Language: English
- Genre: Poetry
- Publisher: Self
- Publication date: July 4, 1855
- Publication place: United States
- Text: Leaves of Grass at Wikisource

Leaves of Grass is a poetry collection by American poet Walt Whitman. After self-publishing it in 1855, he spent most of his professional life writing, revising, and expanding the collection until his death in 1892. Either six or nine separate editions of the book were produced, depending on how one defines a new edition. The continual modifications to Leaves of Grass resulted in vastly different copies of it circulating in Whitman's lifetime. The first edition was a slim tract of twelve poems, and the last was a compilation of over 400 poems.

The book represents a celebration of Whitman's philosophy of life and humanity in which he praises nature and the individual's role in it. He catalogues the expansiveness of American democracy. Rather than dwell on religious or spiritual themes, he focuses primarily on the body and the material world. With very few exceptions, Whitman's poems do not rhyme or follow conventional rules for meter and line length.

Leaves of Grass was notable for its discussion of delight in sensual pleasures at a time when such candid displays were considered immoral. The book was highly controversial for its explicit sexual imagery, and Whitman was subject to derision by many contemporary critics. Over the decades, however, the collection has infiltrated popular culture and become recognized as one of the central works of American poetry.

Among the poems in the early Leaves of Grass editions (albeit sometimes under different titles) were "Song of Myself", "Song of the Open Road", "I Sing the Body Electric", "Out of the Cradle Endlessly Rocking", and "Crossing Brooklyn Ferry". Later editions would contain Whitman's elegy to the assassinated President Abraham Lincoln, "When Lilacs Last in the Dooryard Bloom'd".

== Publication history and origin ==
=== Initial publication, 1855 ===
The first edition of Leaves of Grass was self-published on July 4, 1855. This collection of twelve poems had its beginnings in an essay by Ralph Waldo Emerson entitled "The Poet" (1844), which called for the United States to develop its own new, unique poet who could write about the young country's virtues and vices. This call, along with a challenge to abandon strict rhyme and meter, were partly embodied in the early 19th century works of John Neal: in his poems as well as his novels Randolph (1823) and Rachel Dyer (1828). Whitman, likely having read Neal, consciously set out to answer Emerson's call in the first edition of Leaves of Grass. Whitman later commented on Emerson's influence: "I was simmering, simmering, simmering; Emerson brought me to a boil."

On May 15, 1855, Whitman registered the title Leaves of Grass with the clerk of the United States District Court, Southern District of New Jersey, and received its copyright. The title is a pun, as grass was a term given by publishers to works of minor value, and leaves is another name for the pages on which they were printed. The first edition was published in Brooklyn at the printing shop of two Scottish immigrants, James and Andrew Rome, whom Whitman had known since the 1840s. The shop was located at Fulton Street (now Cadman Plaza West) and Cranberry Street, now the site of apartment buildings that bear Whitman's name. Whitman paid for and did much of the typesetting for the first edition himself.

A calculated feature of the first edition was that it included neither the author's nor the publisher's name (both the author and publisher being Whitman). Instead, the cover included an engraving by Samuel Hollyer depicting Whitman himself—in work clothes and a jaunty hat, arms at his side. This figure was meant to represent the devil-may-care American working man of the time, one who might be taken as an almost idealized figure in any crowd. The engraver, later commenting on his depiction, described the character with "a rakish kind of slant, like the mast of a schooner".

The 1855 edition contained no table of contents, and none of the poems had a title. Early advertisements appealed to "lovers of literary curiosities", quoting an excerpt from Charles A. Dana's review in the New York Tribune. Sales of Whitman's book were few, but the poet was not discouraged. This was the edition that introduced his poems "Song of Myself", "I Sing the Body Electric", and "There Was a Child Went Forth".

Whitman sent one paper-bound copy of the 1855 Leaves of Grass to Emerson, who had inspired its creation. He responded with a letter of heartfelt thanks, writing, "I find it the most extraordinary piece of wit and wisdom America has yet contributed." He went on, "I am very happy in reading it, as great power makes us happy." The letter was printed in the New York Tribune—without the writer's permission—and caused an uproar among prominent New England men of letters, including Henry David Thoreau and Amos Bronson Alcott, who were some of the few Transcendentalists who agreed with Emerson's letter and his statements regarding Leaves of Grass.

Dear Sir,

I am not blind to the worth of the wonderful gift of Leaves of Grass. I find it the most extraordinary piece of wit & wisdom that America has yet contributed. I am very happy in reading it, as great power makes us happy. It meets the demand I am always making of what seemed the sterile & stingy Nature, as if too much handiwork or too much lymph in the temperament were making our western wits fat & mean. I give you joy of your free & brave thought. I have great joy in it. I find incomparable things said incomparably well, as they must be. I find the courage of treatment, which so delights us, & which large perception only can inspire. I greet you at the beginning of a great career, which yet must have had a long foreground somewhere, for such a start. I rubbed my eyes a little to see if this sunbeam were no illusion; but the solid sense of the book is a sober certainty. It had the best merits, namely, of fortifying & encouraging.

I did not know until I, last night, saw the book advertised in a newspaper, that I could trust the name as real & available for a post-office. I wish to see my benefactor, & have felt much like striking my tasks, & visiting New York to pay you my respects.

R. W. Emerson

Letter to Walter Whitman July 21, 1855

The first edition was a slim volume, consisting of only 95 pages. Whitman once said he intended the book to be small enough to be carried in a pocket: "That would tend to induce people to take me along with them and read me in the open air: I am nearly always successful with the reader in the open air", he explained. About 800 copies were printed, though only 200 were bound in its trademark green cloth cover. Furthermore, a census of the 1855 edition by scholar Ed Folsom has revealed that "there are far more variations from copy to copy than have been previously known", including in the missing final period of "Song of Myself", which Folsom demonstrates to have been due to a printing mishap. The only American library known to have purchased a copy of the first edition of the book was in Philadelphia. The twelve first edition poems, given titles in later editions, included:

- "Song of Myself"
- "A Song for Occupations"
- "To Think of Time"
- "The Sleepers"
- "I Sing the Body Electric"
- "Faces"
- "Song of the Answerer"
- "Europe: The 72d and 73d Years of These States"
- "A Boston Ballad"
- "There Was a Child Went Forth"
- "Who Learns My Lesson Complete?"
- "Great Are the Myths"

=== Republications, 1856–1889 ===
Leaves of Grass went through six or nine editions, depending on how new editions are distinguished. Scholars who hold that a separate edition is characterized by an entirely new set of type will only count the 1855, 1856, 1860, 1867, 1871–72, and 1881 printings; whereas others who do not mandate that criterion will also count the reprintings in 1876, 1888–1889, and 1891–1892 (the so-called "deathbed edition"). The editions were of varying length, each one larger and augmented from the previous version—the final edition reached over 400 poems.

==== 1856–1860 ====
Emerson's positive response to the 1855 edition inspired Whitman to quickly produce a much-expanded second edition in 1856. This new Leaves of Grass contained 384 pages and had a cover price of one dollar. It also included a phrase from Emerson's letter, printed in gold leaf: "I Greet You at the Beginning of a Great Career." Recognized as a "first" for U.S. book publishing and marketing techniques, Whitman has been cited as "inventing" the use of the book blurb. Professor Laura Dassow Walls noted, "In one stroke, Whitman had given birth to the modern cover blurb, quite without Emerson's permission." Emerson later took offense that his letter was made public and became more critical of Whitman's work. The 1856 edition added "Sun-Down Poem" (retitled "Crossing Brooklyn Ferry" in the 1860 edition) and "Poem of Procreation" (retitled "A Woman Waits for Me" in the 1867 edition).

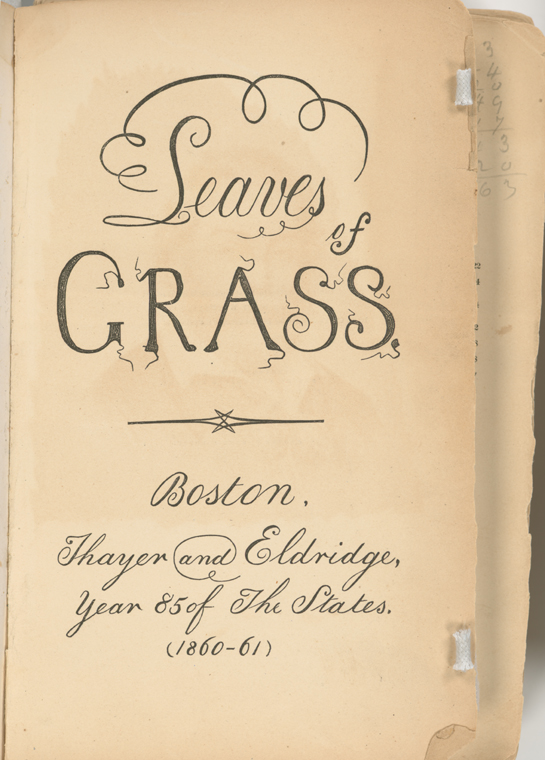
Cover of 1860 edition

Thayer & Eldridge, publishers of the 1860 edition, declared bankruptcy shortly after the book's publication, and were almost unable to pay Whitman. "In regard to money matters", they wrote, "we are very short ourselves and it is quite impossible to send the sum". Whitman received only $250, and the original plates made their way to Boston publisher Horace Wentworth. When the 456-page book was finally issued, Whitman said, "It is quite 'odd', of course", referring to its appearance: it was bound in orange cloth with symbols like a rising sun with nine spokes of light and a butterfly perched on a hand. Whitman claimed that the butterfly was real in order to foster his image as being "one with nature". In fact, the butterfly was made of cloth and was attached to his finger with wire. The design of the cover also included spermatic imagery. The major poems added to this edition were "A Word Out of the Sea" (later retitled "Out of the Cradle Endlessly Rocking"), "Whoever You Are Holding Me Now in Hand", "I Hear America Singing", and "As I Ebb'd With the Ocean of Life".

==== 1867–1889 ====
The 1867 edition was intended to be, according to Whitman, "a new & much better edition of Leaves of Grass complete — that unkillable work!" He assumed it would be the final edition. It included the Drum-Taps section, its Sequel, and the new Songs before Parting. Ed Folsom has described this fusing of Whitman's Civil War-writings into Leaves of Grass as the beginning of "a long process of post-war reconstruction of Leaves that mirrors the Reconstruction of the nation that was occurring at the same time." The publication of the edition was delayed when the binder went bankrupt and its distributing firm failed. When it was finally printed, it was a simple edition and the first to omit a picture of the poet.

In 1879, Richard Worthington purchased the electrotype plates and began printing and marketing unauthorized copies of Leaves of Grass.

Whitman scholar Dennis Renner has written that the 1881 edition gave the poet "a chance to consolidate and unify his work late in his career. He could achieve 'the consecutiveness and ensemble' he had always wanted". He spent the summer of 1881 revising the book and oversaw its October publication in Boston by James R. Osgood and Co. Most modern reissues of Leaves of Grass treat the 1881 edition as the definitive collection. This edition incorporated poems from his prior collections, Passage to India (1871) and Two Rivulets (1876).

The 1889 (eighth) edition was little changed from the 1881 version, but it was more embellished and featured several portraits of Whitman. The biggest change was the addition of an "Annex" of miscellaneous extra poems.

==== Sections ====
By its later editions, Leaves of Grass had grown to 14 sections:

- Inscriptions
- Children of Adam
- Calamus
- Birds of Passage
- Sea-Drift
- By the Roadside
- Drum-Taps
- Memories of President Lincoln
- Autumn Rivulets
- Whispers of Heavenly Death
- From Noon to Starry Night
- Songs of Parting
- First Annex: Sands at Seventy
- Second Annex: Good-bye My Fancy

Earlier editions contained a section called "Chants Democratic"; later editions omitted some of the poems from this section, publishing others in "Calamus" and other sections.

=== Deathbed edition, 1892 ===
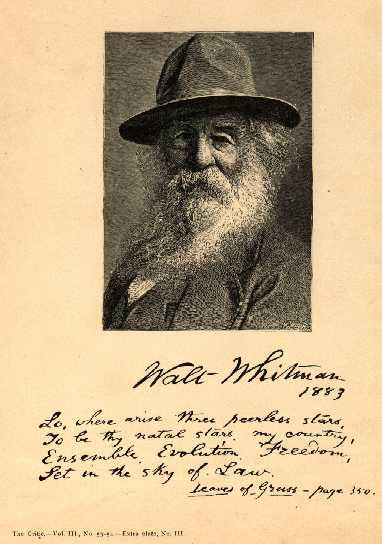
Frontispiece engraving created in 1883

As 1891 came to a close, Whitman prepared a final edition of Leaves of Grass. By this time, he used a wheelchair, having suffered a series of strokes that left him partially paralyzed. He wrote to a friend after finishing the final edition: "L. of G. at last complete — after 33 y'rs of hackling at it, all times & moods of my life, fair weather & foul, all parts of the land, and peace & war, young & old." This last version of Leaves of Grass was published in 1892 and is referred to as the 'deathbed edition'. In January 1892, two months before Whitman's death, an announcement was published in the New York Herald:

Walt Whitman wishes respectfully to notify the public that the book Leaves of Grass, which he has been working on at great intervals and partially issued for the past thirty-five or forty years, is now completed, so to call it, and he would like this new 1892 edition to absolutely supersede all previous ones. Faulty as it is, he decides it as by far his special and entire self-chosen poetic utterance.

By 1892, Leaves of Grass had expanded from a small book of twelve poems to a hefty tome of almost 400 poems. As the volume changed, so did the pictures that Whitman used to illustrate himself—the last edition depicts an older Whitman with a full beard and wearing a jacket.

=== Translations ===
In 1995, Dail Glaswellt, the Welsh language translation was published.

== Analysis ==
Analysis of Leaves of Grass is complicated by Whitman's continual revisions to the book. Most scholarly discussions have concentrated on the major early editions of 1856 and 1860, along with the collections published in 1881 and 1892. The later editions of Leaves of Grass would include such well-known poems as "Pioneers! O Pioneers!", "A Noiseless Patient Spider", and the poet's elegies to Abraham Lincoln, "O Captain! My Captain!" and "When Lilacs Last in the Dooryard Bloom'd".

While Whitman famously proclaimed (in "Song of Myself") that his poetry was "Nature without check with original energy", literary scholars have discovered that Whitman borrowed from a number of sources for Leaves of Grass. For instance, in his war poems collected in Drum-Taps, he lifted phrases from popular newspapers dealing with Civil War battles. He also condensed a chapter from a popular science book into his poem "The World Below the Brine".

In a constantly changing culture, Whitman's literature has an element of timelessness that appeals to the American notion of democracy and equality, producing the same experience and feelings within people living centuries apart. Originally written at a time of significant urbanization in America, Leaves of Grass also responds to the impact such has on the masses. The title metaphor of grass, however, indicates a pastoral vision of rural idealism.

Particularly in "Song of Myself", Whitman emphasizes an all-powerful "I" who serves as narrator. The "I" attempts to relieve both social and private problems by using powerful affirmative cultural images; the emphasis on American culture in particular helped reach Whitman's intention of creating a distinctly American epic poem comparable to the works of Homer.

As a believer in phrenology, Whitman lists in his 1855 Leaves of Grass preface the phrenologist among those described as "the lawgivers of poets". Borrowing from phrenology, Whitman uses the concept of adhesiveness in reference to the human propensity for friendship and camaraderie.

== Critical response and controversy ==
When Leaves of Grass was first published, Whitman was fired from his job at the Department of the Interior after Secretary of the Interior James Harlan read it and said he found it offensive. An early review of the 1855 edition focused on the persona of the anonymous poet, calling him a loafer "with a certain air of mild defiance, and an expression of pensive insolence on his face". Another reviewer labeled the work an odd attempt at reviving old Transcendental thoughts, "the speculations of that school of thought which culminated at Boston fifteen or eighteen years ago". Emerson approved of the collection in part because he considered it a means of reviving Transcendentalism, though even he urged Whitman to tone down the sexual imagery.

Poet John Greenleaf Whittier was said to have thrown his 1855 edition into the fire. Thomas Wentworth Higginson wrote, "It is no discredit to Walt Whitman that he wrote Leaves of Grass, only that he did not burn it afterwards." The Saturday Press printed a thrashing review that advised its author to commit suicide.

Critic Rufus Wilmot Griswold reviewed Leaves of Grass in the November 10, 1855 issue of The Criterion, calling it "a mass of stupid filth", and categorized its author as a filthy free lover. Griswold also suggested, in Latin, that Whitman was guilty of "that horrible sin not to be mentioned among Christians", one of the earliest public accusations of Whitman's homosexuality. Griswold's intensely negative review almost caused the publication of the second edition to be suspended. Whitman incorporated the full review, including the innuendo, in a later edition of Leaves of Grass.

Not all responses were negative. Critic William Michael Rossetti considered Leaves of Grass a classic along the lines of the works of William Shakespeare and Dante Alighieri. A Connecticut woman named Susan Garnet Smith wrote to Whitman to profess her love for him after reading Leaves of Grass and even offered him her womb should he want a child. Although he found much of the language "reckless and indecent", critic and editor George Ripley believed "isolated portions" of Leaves of Grass radiated "vigor and quaint beauty".

Whitman firmly believed he would be accepted and embraced by the populace, especially the working class. Years later, he regretted not having toured the country to deliver his poetry directly by lecturing:

If I had gone directly to the people, read my poems, faced the crowds, got into immediate touch with Tom, Dick, and Harry instead of waiting to be interpreted, I'd have had my audience at once.

=== Censorship in the United States ===
On March 1, 1882, Boston district attorney Oliver Stevens wrote to Whitman's publisher, James R. Osgood, that Leaves of Grass constituted "obscene literature". Urged by the New England Society for the Suppression of Vice, his letter said:

We are of the opinion that this book is such a book as brings it within the provisions of the Public Statutes respecting obscene literature and suggest the propriety of withdrawing the same from circulation and suppressing the editions thereof.

Stevens demanded the removal of the poems "A Woman Waits for Me" and "To a Common Prostitute", as well as changes to "Song of Myself", "From Pent-Up Aching Rivers", "I Sing the Body Electric", "Spontaneous Me", "Native Moments", "The Dalliance of the Eagles", "By Blue Ontario's Shore", "Unfolded Out of the Folds", "The Sleepers", and "Faces".

Whitman rejected the censorship, writing to Osgood, "The list whole & several is rejected by me, & will not be thought of under any circumstances." Osgood refused to republish the book and returned the plates to Whitman when his suggested changes and deletions were ignored. The poet found a different publisher, Rees Welsh & Company, that released a new edition of the book in 1882. Whitman believed the controversy would increase sales, which proved true. Its banning in Boston, for example, became a major scandal and it generated much publicity for Whitman and his work. Though it was also banned by retailers like Wanamaker's in Philadelphia, this version went through five editions of 1,000 copies each. Its first printing, released on July 18, sold out in a day.

== Legacy ==
A 1913 illustrated edition of Leaves of Grass

Its status as one of the more important collections of American poetry has meant that over time various groups and movements have used Leaves of Grass, and Whitman's work in general, to advance their own political and social purposes. For example:

- In the first half of the 20th century, the popular Little Blue Book series introduced Whitman's work to a wider audience than ever before. A series that backed socialist and progressive viewpoints, the publication connected the poet's focus on the common man to the empowerment of the working class.
- During World War II, the U.S. government distributed for free much of Whitman's poetry to their soldiers, in the belief that his celebrations of the American Way would inspire the people tasked with protecting it.
- Whitman's work has been claimed in the name of racial equality. In a preface to the 1946 anthology I Hear the People Singing: Selected Poems of Walt Whitman, Langston Hughes wrote that Whitman's "all-embracing words lock arms with workers and farmers, Negroes and whites, Asiatics and Europeans, serfs, and free men, beaming democracy to all."
- Similarly, a 1970 volume of Whitman's poetry published by the United States Information Agency describes Whitman as a man who will "mix indiscriminately" with the people. The volume, which was presented for an international audience, attempted to present Whitman as representative of an America that accepts people of all groups.

Nevertheless, Whitman has been criticized for the nationalism expressed in Leaves of Grass and other works. In a 2009 essay regarding Whitman's nationalism in the first edition, Nathanael O'Reilly claims that "Whitman's imagined America is arrogant, expansionist, hierarchical, racist and exclusive; such an America is unacceptable to Native Americans, African-Americans, immigrants, the disabled, the infertile, and all those who value equal rights."

"America"
An 1890 recording, thought to be of Walt Whitman, reading the opening four lines of his poem "America", which is included in Leaves of Grass.

== In popular culture ==
=== Film and television ===
- A portion of the book was recited in the movie With Honours (1994).
- "The Untold Want" features prominently in the Academy Award-winning 1942 film Now, Voyager, starring Claude Rains, Bette Davis, and Paul Henreid.
- Dead Poets Society (1989) makes repeated references to the poem "O Captain! My Captain!", along with other references to Whitman.
- In the independent film The Incredibly True Adventure of Two Girls in Love (1995), the two main characters spend their summer reading Leaves of Grass.
- In The Simpsons' "Mother Simpson" episode (1995), Homer kicks Whitman's grave after discovering it is not his mother's, proclaiming: "Leaves of Grass, my ass!".
- Leaves of Grass plays a prominent role in the American television series Breaking Bad. Episode eight of season five ("Gliding Over All", after poem 271 of Leaves of Grass) pulls together many of the series' references to Leaves of Grass, such as the fact that protagonist Walter White has the same initials (and almost the same name) as Walt Whitman (as noted in episode four of season four, "Bullet Points", and made more salient in "Gliding Over All"), that leads DEA agent Hank Schrader to gradually realize Walter is the notorious drug dealer Heisenberg. Numerous reviewers have analyzed and discussed the various connections among Walt Whitman/Leaves of Grass/"Gliding Over All", Walter White, and the show.
- In Peace, Love & Misunderstanding (2011), Leaves of Grass is read by Jane Fonda and Elizabeth Olsen's characters.
- In season 3, episode 8 of the BYU TV series Granite Flats, Timothy gives Madeline a first-edition copy of Leaves of Grass as a Christmas gift.
- American singer Lana Del Rey quotes some verses from Whitman's "I Sing the Body Electric" in her short film Tropico (2013).
- In season 1, episode 3 of Ratched (2020) Lily Cartwright is seen reading Leaves of Grass while on psychiatric admission for "sodomy".
- In Bull Durham (1988), Susan Sarandon's character Annie Savoy reads Tim Robbins's character, Ebby Calvin "Nuke" Laloosh, excerpts from Whitman's "I Sing the Body Electric". When Nuke asks Annie who Walt Whitman plays for, she responds "He sort of pitches for the Cosmic All-Stars".
- In season 3, episode 5 of Dr. Quinn, Medicine Woman, Joe Lando's character, Byron Sully, reads an excerpt from section 22 of "Song of Myself" to Dr. Mike. She becomes uneasy at the innuendos suggested in the poem.
- In season 4, episode 1 of BoJack Horseman (2014), the character of Mr. Peanutbutter is given a copy of Leaves of Grass by his ski instructor Professor Thistlethorpe, though it is attributed to "Walt Whitmantis" instead of Walt Whitman.

=== Literature ===
- "I Sing the Body Electric" was used by author Ray Bradbury as the title of both a 1969 short story and the book it appeared in (I Sing the Body Electric!), after first appearing as the title of an episode Bradbury wrote in 1962 for The Twilight Zone (I Sing the Body Electric).
- Leaves of Grass features prominently in Lauren Gunderson's American Theatre Critics Association award-winning play I and You (2013).
- Roger Zelazny's 1979 time-travel novel Roadmarks features a cybernetically-enhanced edition of Leaves of Grass, one of two such in the story, that acts as a side character giving the protagonist advice and quoting the original. The other "book" is Baudelaire's Les Fleurs du Mal.
- Leaves of Grass appears in John Green's 2008 novel Paper Towns, in which the poem "Song of Myself" plays a particularly noteworthy role in the plot.

=== Music ===
- "A Sea Symphony" (Symphony No. 1) by Ralph Vaughan Williams contains text from Leaves of Grass, written between 1903 and 1909.
- I Sing the Body Electric (1972) is the second album released by Weather Report.
- Leaves of Grass: A Choral Symphony was composed by Robert Strassburg in 1992.
- American singer Lana Del Rey references Walt Whitman and Leaves of Grass in her song "Body Electric", from her EP Paradise (2012).
- "Drei Hymnen von Walt Whitman" (1919) by Paul Hindemith uses translated German text from "Ages and ages, returning at intervals"; "When Lilacs Last in the Dooryard Bloom'd"; "Beat! Beat! Drums!"
- "Weave in, my hardy life" is a composition by Aaron Travers for choir, bandoneon and piano, and is a setting of the poem of that name from the "From Noon to Starry Night" section of Leaves of Grass.
- In 1990, rock band R.E.M. posed with some of their favorite books for an American Library Association campaign poster to encourage literacy and reading. Singer Michael Stipe is holding a copy of Leaves of Grass.
