= Dail Glaswellt =

Welsh translation of a book by Walt Whitman

Dail Glaswellt is the Welsh language translation of Leaves of Grass, (1855) by Walt Whitman. It was translated by the academic and author M. Wyn Thomas as part of a poetry series published by the Welsh Academy 'Cyfres Barddoniaeth Pwyllgor Cyfieithiadau'r Academi Gymreig - Cyfrol X' in 1995. Whitman's works have been translated into many languages, and he is amongst the United States' most famous writers.
