= We Two Boys Together Clinging =

Painting by David Hockney

- Artist: David Hockney
- Year: 1961
- Type: Oil on board
- Dimensions: 120 cm × 150 cm (48 in × 60 in)
- Location: Arts Council Collection, London

We Two Boys Together Clinging is an oil on board painting by David Hockney, from 1961. The painting is part of the Arts Council Collection, in London.

== Background ==
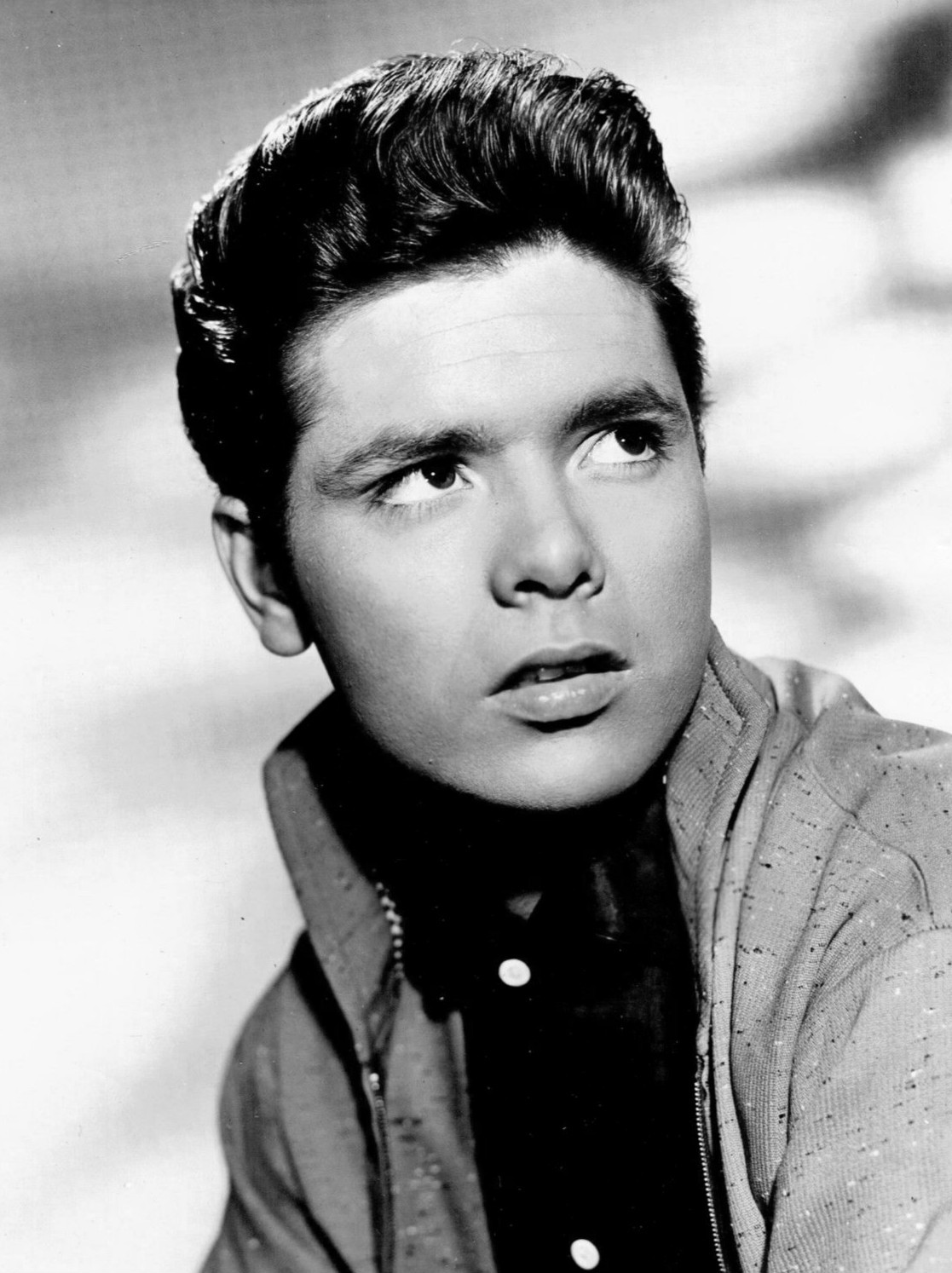
Cliff Richard in 1960

The work was one of several homoerotic paintings created by Hockney in 1961 during his second year at the Royal College of Art, alongside Doll Boy and The Most Beautiful Boy in the World. Hockney's biographer Christopher Sykes described the painting as "one of Hockney's most iconic images" and that it was "both touching and funny".

The work was inspired by a newspaper headline of a mountaineering accident, "Two Boys Cling to Cliff all Night", (Note: A 1975 newspaper article discussing Hockney gave the headline as "Boy Clings to Cliff All Night".) which Hockney saw as an allusion to pop star Cliff Richard, whom Hockney had several pin-up photographs of on his studio wall, and the poem "We Two Boys Together Clinging" by Walt Whitman from his Calamus sequence of poems. An experimental watercolour study preceded the painting. Hockney subsequently said of his early homoerotic paintings that as depictions of homosexuality they were "partly propaganda of something that hadn't been propagandised" and that the title line by Whitman was a "marvellous, beautiful, poetic line". The painting was created several years prior to the decriminalization of homosexual acts between males in England and Wales by the Sexual Offences Act 1967.

== Description ==
The painting is oil on board and measures 48 by 60 inches (120 by 150 cm). It depicts two figures bound together with "tentacles of desire". The figures are shown standing in front of the wall of a lavatory with graffiti. A coded reference appears in the lower-left corner of the painting: 4.2 signifying the letters DB, (Note: Hockney used a simple letter-to-number cipher, whereby A=1, B=2, C=3, and so forth through Z=26.) for "Doll Boy", a term Hockney used to refer to Cliff Richard. (Note: Hockney's Doll Boy painting contains the coded reference 3.18 signifying the letters "CR" for Cliff Richard.) Across the figure depicting Hockney is painted the word "never", which suggests that the figures' desire will be unrequited. Two lines from the poem by Whitman are on the right side of the painting, (Note: The excerpt from Whitman's poem, visible in high resolution images of the painting, is "Power enjoying, elbows stretching, fingers clutching / Arm'd and fearless, eating, drinking, sleeping, loving".) which act as "a commentary on the men's activities".

The description of the painting on the Arts Council Collection website describes Hockney's style as influenced by Jean Dubuffet which "gives the painting a crudity and vigour but also shrouds the identity of the artist in mock-anonymity".

== Sources ==
- Sykes, Christopher Simon (2011). Hockney: The Biography, Vol. 1: 1937-1975. London: Century. ISBN 978-1-84605-708-3.
