= Robert Strassburg =

American musician (1915–2003)

- Born: August 30, 1915; New York City, U.S.
- Died: October 25, 2003 (aged 88)
- Occupations: Conductor, composer, musicologist
- Years active: 1945–1997

Robert Strassburg (August 30, 1915 – October 25, 2003) was an American conductor, composer, musicologist and music educator. Included among his compositions are numerous musical settings of the poetry of Walt Whitman, as well as several sacred Judaic choral works. As a musicologist, Strassburg was an authority on the compositions of the composer Ernest Bloch.

== Biography ==
=== Early life ===
Robert Strassburg was born in New York City. Among his teachers in Tanglewood were Igor Stravinsky, Walter Piston and Paul Hindemith. His formal academic studies were completed at the New England Conservatory of Music and Harvard University, where he obtained a fellowship in composition. He also completed a doctorate in Fine Arts at the University of Judaism in Los Angeles.

=== Academic career ===
Strassburg's professional career as an educator begain at the Philadelphia Music Settlement School, where he served as the chairman of the composition and theory department from 1943 until 1947. After serving as a lecturer at Brooklyn College (1947–1950), Strassburg obtained a position as artist in residence at the Brandeis Arts Institute in Santa Susana, California (1951–1955). He was also the music director of the institute's music camp in Hendersonville, North Carolina. During his years in Miami, he founded the All-Miami Youth Symphony (today the Greater Miami Youth Symphony) in 1958, and was conductor until 1961. Additional contributions were made as the assistant dean for the School of Fine Arts at the University of Judaism (now the American Jewish University) in Los Angeles (1961–1966). This culminated in an appointment as professor of music at Cal State Los Angeles in 1966. During this time he curated the Roy Harris Archive and published a catalogue of Harris' compositions.

== Compositions ==
External audio
- You may hear Robert Strassburg conducting the Period Choral Society performing sacred choral music by Giovanni Pierluigi da Palestrina in 1957; Here on archive.org
- You may hear excerpts from Strassburg's opera "Chelm"; Here on Milken Archive

One of Strassburg's earliest compositions Lost was completed in 1945 and received critical acclaim. As music director for various synagogues Strassburg expressed a keen interest in Jewish liturgical music and completed several sacred compositions as well as music inspired by Jewish historical themes. His secular music included several works inspired by the poetry of Walt Whitman. Strassburg also contributed to a variety of film scores as well as incidental music for such theatrical productions as: King Lear, The Rose Tattoo, and Anne of the Thousand Days

=== Liturgical ===
- Lost (1945)
- 4 Biblical Statements (1946)
- Torah Sonata (piano, 1950)
- A Gilgul fun a Nign (Migrations of a Melody) - on a text by Isaac Leyb for baritone, narrator, and chamber orchestra.
- Festival of Lights Symphony - for string orchestra
- Kabbalat Shabbat (Liturgical)
- L’kha odi - for Kabbalat Shabbat services.
- Mosaic Horizons (Litrugical for organ)
- Mah Tavu: High Holiday for Cantor, mixed choir (SATB) with optional keyboard, 1993
- Patriarchs (String Orchestra)
- Psalm 117 (Choral, 1965)
- Torah Sonata - for piano.
- Tropal Suite (String Quartet, 1967)
- Terecentenary Suite (Viola & Piano)

=== Secular ===
- Fantasy and Allegro (1947)
- Festival of Lights Symphony (String Orchestra)
- Migrations of a Melody (Baritone Narrator Chamber Orchestra)
- Prayer of Columbus (for Voice & Piano, 1993)
- The Heritage of Heaven (string orchestra, 1955)
- Chelm (Opera, 1956)
- Walt Whitman Cycle - (Tenor & Orchestra).
- Congo Square- (Opera in one act)
- Leaves of Grass: A Choral Symphony (Choral symphony, 1992)
- Three "Leaves of Grass" – A Walt Whitman Trilogy (Piano, 1996)

=== Publications ===
In 1977, Strassburg wrote a biography of Ernest Bloch, Ernest Bloch: Voice in the Wilderness. The research materials for this publication along with Strassburg's notes are accessible at the Belknap Collection for the Performing Arts. The collection is archived for research purposes at the University of Florida, Gainesville.

=== Students ===
Among Strassburg's pupils are Yehudi Wyner, Jack Gottlieb, Charles Davidson, Diane Thome and John Serry.

== Compositions ==
External audio
- You may hear Robert Strassburg conducting the Period Choral Society performing sacred choral music by Giovanni Pierluigi da Palestrina in 1957; Here on archive.org
- You may hear excerpts from Strassburg's opera "Chelm"; Here on Milken Archive

- Lost (1945)
- 4 Biblical Statements (1946)
- Fantasy and Allegro (1947)
- Torah Sonata (piano, 1950)
- The Heritage of Heaven (string orchestra, 1955)
- Chelm (Opera, 1956)
- Psalm 117 (Choral, 1965)
- Tropal Suite (String Quartet, 1967)
- Terecentenary Suite (Viola & Piano)
- Patriarchs (String Orchestra)
- Migrations of a Melody (Baritone Narrator Chamber Orchestra)
- Festival of Lights Symphony (String Orchestra)
- Leaves of Grass: A Choral Symphony (Choral symphony, 1992)
- Mah Tavu: High Holiday for Cantor, mixed choir (SATB) with optional keyboard, 1993
- Prayer of Columbus ( for Voice & Piano, 1993)
- Three "Leaves of Grass" – A Walt Whitman Trilogy (Piano, 1996)
- Walt Whitman Cycle (Tenor & Orchestra)
- Congo Square (Opera)
- Kabbalat Shabbat (Liturgical)
- Mosaic Horizons (Liturgical)

== Archives ==
- Audio recordings of several liturgical works composed by Robert Strassburg have been archived within the Milken Archive of Jewish Music.
- The Robert Strassburg Collection on Ernest Bloch is a repository of research materials which relate to the composer Ernest Bloch and Strassburg's professional endeavors as archived at the University of Florida - Gainsville within the Belknap Collection for the Performing Arts.

== Musical influences ==
Strassburg enjoyed close contact with several other composers of his era including:

- Paul Ben-Haim
- Mario Castelnuovo-Tedesco
- Julius Chajes
- Erich Zeisl
