= One Hour to Madness and Joy =

Poem by Walt Whitman

"One Hour to Madness and Joy" is an 1860 poem by Walt Whitman.
