= Out of the Cradle Endlessly Rocking =

Poem by Walt Whitman

"Out of the Cradle Endlessly Rocking" by American poet Walt Whitman is one of his most complex and successfully integrated poems.

Some critics have taken the poem to be an elegy mourning the death of someone dear to him. The basic theme of the poem is the relationship between suffering and art. It shows how a boy matures into a poet through his experience of love and death. Art is a sublimation of frustrations and death is a release from the stress and strains caused by such frustrations.

Whitman used several new techniques in the poem. One is the use of images like bird, boy, sea. The influence of music is also seen in opera form. The language is similar to "There Was a Child Went Forth".

== Overview ==
The poem features a young boy walking on the beach who finds two mockingbirds nesting and watches them. The female bird fails to appear one day, and the male bird cries out for her. The bird's cries create an awakening in the boy who translates what the male is saying in the rest of the poem. As this happens, the boy recognizes the impact of nature on the human soul and his own burgeoning consciousness.

== Publication history ==
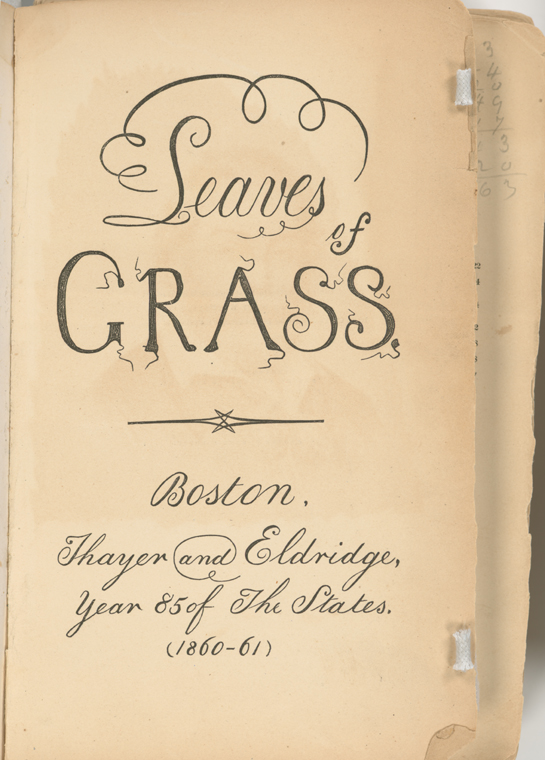
Title page of the 1860 edition of Leaves of Grass, which included "Out of the Cradle Endlessly Rocking"

Originally titled "A Child's Reminiscence", the poem was first published in the Saturday Press on December 24, 1859. The newspaper included this introduction: "Our readers may, if they choose, consider as our Christmas or New Year's present to them, the curious warble by Walt Whitman".

The poem was later included in the 1860 edition of Leaves of Grass under the title "A Word Out of the Sea" (and occasionally erroneously referred to, even by Whitman himself, as "A Voice Out of the Sea"). "Out of the Cradle Endlessly Rocking" is found in the title section, Sea-Drift. Several of Whitman's individuals poems, including "Out of the Cradle Endlessly Rocking", focus on the seashore; his first was "A Sketch".

== Analysis and response ==
Upon its first publication, a reviewer for the Cincinnati newspaper Daily Commercial called the poem "unmixed and hopeless drivel" and a disgrace to its publisher. Shortly after, on January 7, 1860, the Saturday Press published a response to that review titled "All About a Mocking-Bird", celebrating Whitman's poem. This article may have been written by Whitman himself.
