= Song of the Open Road (poem) =

Poem from Walt Whitman's 1856 collection Leaves of Grass

- by Walt Whitman
- Original title: Poem of The Road
- First published in: Leaves of Grass (Second Edition)
- Country: United States of America
- Language: English
- Form: Free verse
- Meter: No regular meter
- Rhyme scheme: No fixed rhyme scheme
- Publication date: 1856

Full text
- Leaves of Grass (1882)/Song of the Open Road at Wikisource

Song of the Open Road is a lyric poem by Walt Whitman, first published in the second edition of his most significant work 'Leaves of Grass' in 1856 as "Poem of The Road". The central theme of the poem celebrates freedom, travel, self-discovery, and equality.

== Historical Context ==
The poem was originally published as "Poem of The Road" in the Second Edition of Leaves of Grass, and received its present title in 1867. Whitman's own interpretation of the work is most nearly expressed in a book on which he collaborated; where it is called "a mystic and indirect chant of aspiration toward a noble life, a vehement demand to reach the very highest point that the human soul is capable of attaining... a religious poem in the truest and best sense of the term".

== Structure and Poetic Devices ==
Its 224 lines were divided into fifteen sections in 1881. Anthologies and educational textbooks often reprint only the opening section, which introduces many of the poem's central themes. The poem is written in free verse without a regular meter or rhyme scheme; a characteristic feature of Whitman's poetic style.

== Concepts ==
The historical context found in “Song of The Open Road” is describing the westward expansion of the United States, “an era characterized by the call of adventure and opportunity for those courageous enough make the journey west, i.e. to follow the open road,” (Kreidler). Kreidler discussed how Whitman was greatly influenced by politics and political movements. Using the westward expansion as inspiration in this piece allowed for Whitman’s audience to better understand and relate to this poem. Whitman also incorporates some religious contexts, like referencing Swedenborgianism. Kreidler explains that, “Swedenborgianism espoused a belief that a spiritual component existed within every living and material being. Swedenborg also believed that every part of the body held a particular communication with the Divine.” In Whitman’s poem the readers can see this belief when he starts to introduce the “Song” in Section 7, “Here is the efflux of the soul; / The efflux of the soul comes from within through embower'd gates, ever provoking questions.”

== The Ending ==
Whitman ends his poem “with the persona awaiting an affirmative response from his reader” (Kummings). The narrator in his poem reaches his hand out to the reader and asks them to join him on the journey. Whitman added this as his poem ending to make the reader question, “will they join him on this journey through the open road?” (Kummings). It is almost as if the narrator doesn’t want to complete the journey of life on his own; he wants the company. This is not a common approach in poem endings, but Whitman also wants to make his readers question, “do you want to complete the journey alone, or do you want to accompany someone for the rest of your life's journey?” By leaving his readers questioning their life choices, Whitman is able to help them figure out their life in a way.
