= Calamus (poems) =

Cluster of poems

The "Calamus" poems are a cluster of poems in Leaves of Grass by Walt Whitman. These poems celebrate and promote "the manly love of comrades". Most critics believe that these poems are Whitman's clearest expressions in print of his ideas about homoerotic male love.

== Genesis and "Live Oak With Moss" ==
The first evidence of the poems that were to become the "Calamus" cluster is an unpublished manuscript sequence of twelve poems entitled "Live Oak With Moss," written in or before spring 1859. These poems were all incorporated in Whitman's 1860 edition of Leaves of Grass, but out of their original sequence. These poems seem to recount the story of a relationship between the speaker of the poems and a male lover. Even in Whitman's intimate writing style, these poems, read in their original sequence, seem unusually personal and candid in their disclosure of love and disappointment, and this manuscript has become central to arguments about Whitman's homoeroticism or homosexuality. This sequence was not known in its original manuscript order until a 1953 article by Fredson Bowers.

== "Calamus" sequence ==
In the 1860 third edition of Leaves of Grass, Whitman included the twelve "Live Oak" poems along with others to form a sequence of 45 untitled numbered poems. This sequence as written celebrates many aspects of "comradeship" or "adhesive love," Whitman's term, borrowed from phrenology to describe male same-sex attraction. This attraction is presented in its political, spiritual, metaphysical, and personal phases—Whitman offering it as the backbone of future nations, the root of religious sentiments, the solution to the big questions of life, and as a source of personal anguish and joy.

The 1860 edition contains three poems that Whitman later edited out of the sequence, including the very personal Calamus 8, "Long I thought that knowledge alone would suffice me," and Calamus 9, "Hours continuing long, sore and heavy-hearted." Whitman's constant editing of his works meant that many of the other poems changed and shifted position in the editions that appeared during his lifetime. By the 1881–82 edition, the number of poems had been reduced to 39. Some critics contend that Whitman's edits tended to reduce some of his most personal and specific disclosures, possibly in an attempt to make the sequence more attractive to a wider audience. Others, such as Betsy Erkkila, note that Whitman retained some equally personal poems for the 1867 edition and view his editorial decisions as a function of Whitman building a particular national persona for himself.

== The meaning of Calamus as a symbol ==
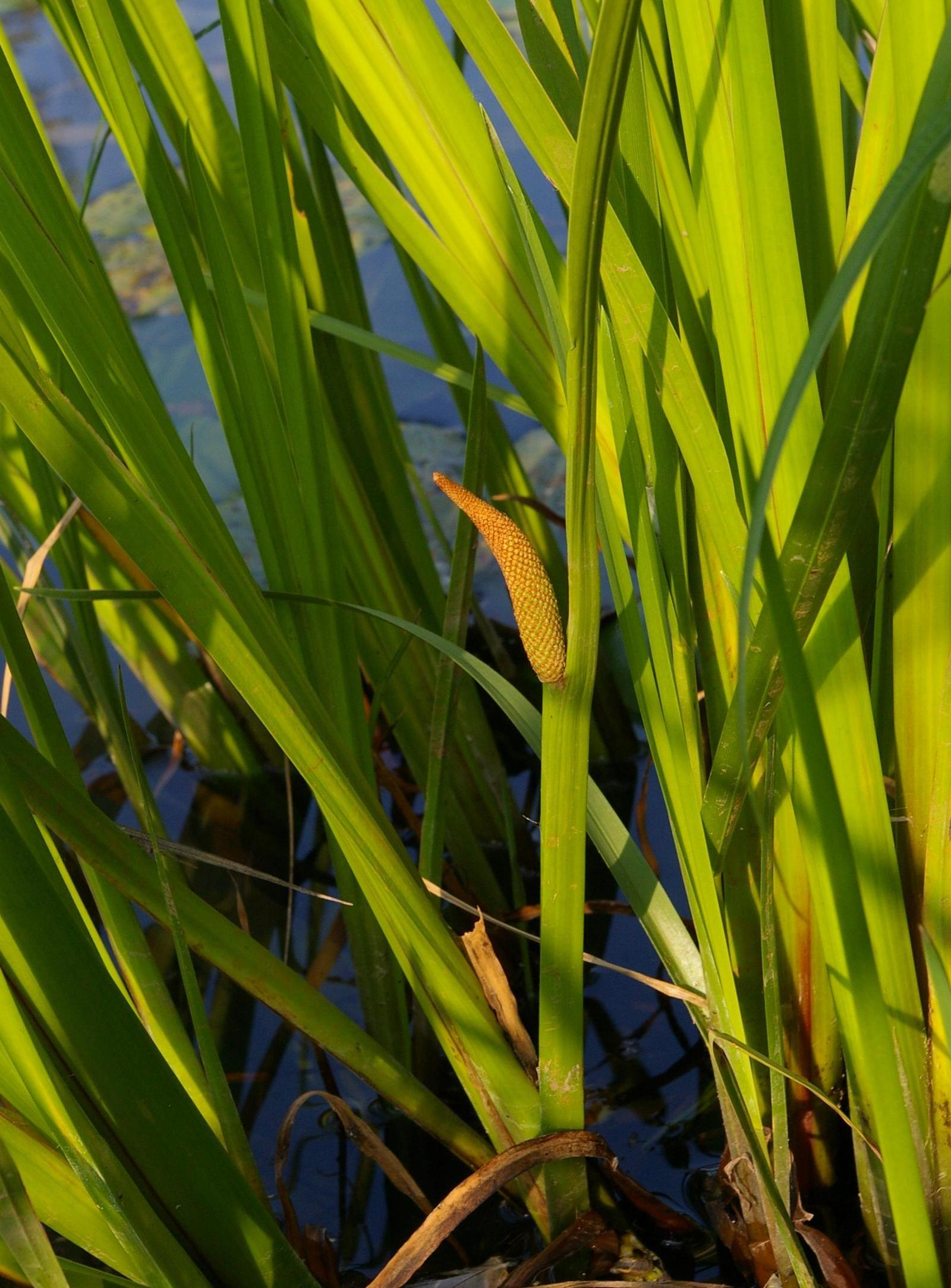
Acorus calamus

This cluster of poems contains a number of images and motifs that are repeated throughout, notably the Calamus root itself. Acorus calamus or Sweet Flag is a marsh-growing plant similar to a cat-tail. Whitman continues through this one of the central images of Leaves of Grass – Calamus is treated as a specific example of the grass that he writes of elsewhere. Some scholars have pointed out, as reasons for Whitman's choice, the phallic shape of what Whitman calls the "pink-tinged roots" of Calamus, its mythological association with male same-sex love, and the allegedly mind-altering effects of the root. The root was chiefly chewed at the time as a breath-freshener and to relieve stomach complaints.

== Contents ==
Calamus cluster includes the following poems:

1. In Paths Untrodden
2. Scented Herbage of My Breast
3. Whoever You Are, Holding Me Now in Hand
4. These I, Singing in Spring
5. A Song
6. Not Heaving From My Ribb'd Breast Only
7. Of the Terrible Doubt of Appearances
8. The Base of All Metaphysics
9. Recorders Ages Hence
10. When I Heard at the Close of the Day
11. Are You the New Person Drawn Toward Me?
12. Roots and Leaves Themselves Alone
13. Not Heat Flames Up and Consumes
14. Trickle, Drops
15. City of Orgies
16. Behold This Swarthy Face
17. I Saw in Louisiana a Live-Oak Growing
18. To a Stranger
19. This Moment, Yearning and Thoughtful
20. I Hear It Was Charged Against Me
21. The Prairie-Grass Dividing
22. We Two Boys Together Clinging (Note: This title was reused by British artist David Hockney for his 1961 painting We Two Boys Together Clinging.)
23. A Promise to California
24. Here the Frailest Leaves of Me
25. When I Peruse the Conquer'd Fame
26. What Think You I Take My Pen in Hand?
27. A Glimpse
28. No Labor-Saving Machine
29. A Leaf for Hand in Hand
30. To the East and to the West
31. Earth! My Likeness!
32. I Dream'd in a Dream
33. Fast Anchor'd, Eternal, O Love!
34. Sometimes With One I Love
35. That Shadow, My Likeness
36. Among the Multitude
37. To a Western Boy
38. O You Whom I Often and Silently Come
39. Full of Life, Now
