= Song of Myself =

Poem by Walt Whitman

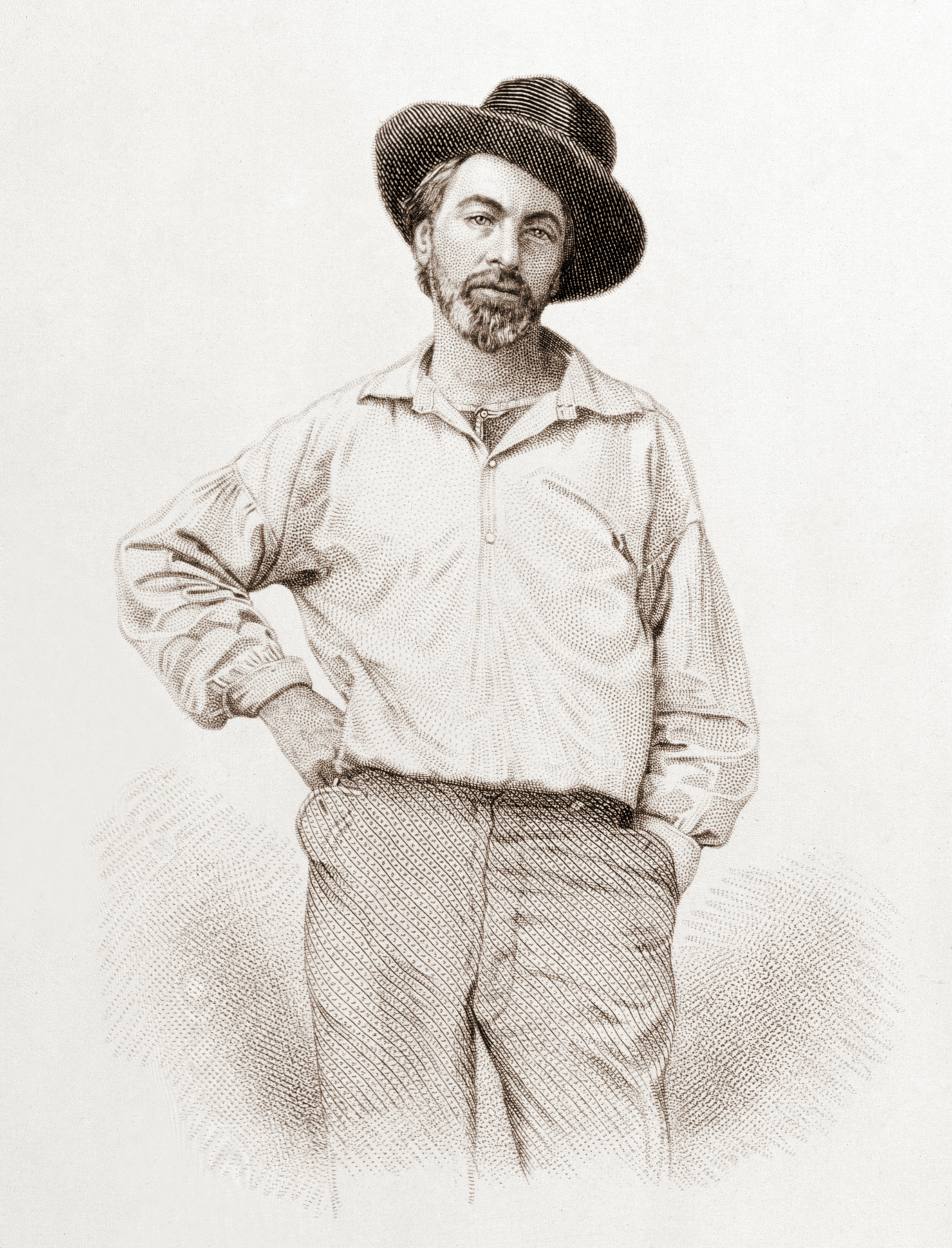
Steel engraving of Walt Whitman.

"Song of Myself" is an epic poem by Walt Whitman (1819-1892) from his book Leaves of Grass that explores the definition of the "American democratic self". The poem detailed this concept through a response to tensions of class disparities, which is relative to his own experiences from a humble life in rural Long Island. It also divulges into topics such as race and sexuality.

Despite its impact as a poem today, even being deemed as Whitman’s "greatest poem", it had a mixed reception upon the Leaves of Grass first edition release. One review in 1855 had labelled it "a mass of stupid filth".

== Publication history ==
The poem was first published without sections as the first of twelve untitled poems in the first (1855) edition of Leaves of Grass. The first edition was published by Whitman at his own expense.

In the second (1856) edition, Whitman used the title Poem of Walt Whitman, an American, which was shortened to Walt Whitman for the third (1860) edition.

The poem was divided into fifty-two numbered sections for the fourth (1867) edition and finally took on the title "Song of Myself" in the last edition (1891–2). The number of sections is generally thought to mirror the number of weeks in the year.

Walt Whitman: Complete Poetry and Collected Prose (the Library of America, 1982) contains the 1855 edition and the 1891–92 edition.

== Reception ==
Following its 1855 publication, "Song of Myself" was immediately singled out by critics and readers for particular attention, and the work remains among the most acclaimed and influential in American poetry. Jay Parini named it the greatest American poem ever written, as did Mark Edmundson.

In 1855, the Christian Spiritualist gave a long, glowing review of "Song of Myself", praising Whitman for representing "a new poetic mediumship," which through active imagination sensed the "influx of spirit and the divine breath." Ralph Waldo Emerson wrote a letter to Whitman, praising the 1855 edition of Leaves of Grass as "the most extraordinary piece of wit and wisdom that America has yet contributed".

Public acceptance was slow in coming, however. Social conservatives denounced the poem as flouting accepted norms of morality due to its blatant depictions of human sexuality. In 1882, Boston's district attorney threatened action against Leaves of Grass for violating the state's obscenity laws and demanded that changes be made to several passages from "Song of Myself". Whitman’s "Song of Myself" was so negatively reviewed by critics when it was first released that it received very little critical acclaim during Whitman’s lifetime. Moreover, it was frequently banned in public libraries and received some sneering reviews from a variety of contemporary critics. Due to negative public reception, Whitman’s "Song of Myself" was virtually unread by a wider audience outside of critics and those Whitman provided with copies personally.

"I ridiculed Leaves of Grass as the most intricate idiocy that a preposterous pen had ever written."

In response to the overwhelmingly negative reviews of his poem, Walt Whitman published his own review of "Song of Myself" under an anonymous handle, where he writes;

"An American bard at last! One of the roughs, large, proud, affectionate, eating, drinking and breeding, his costume manly and free, his face sunburnt and bearded, his posture strong and erect, his voice bringing hope and prophecy to the generous races of young and old."

"No sniveller, or tea-drinking poet, no puny clawback or prude, is Walt Whitman."

== Literary style ==
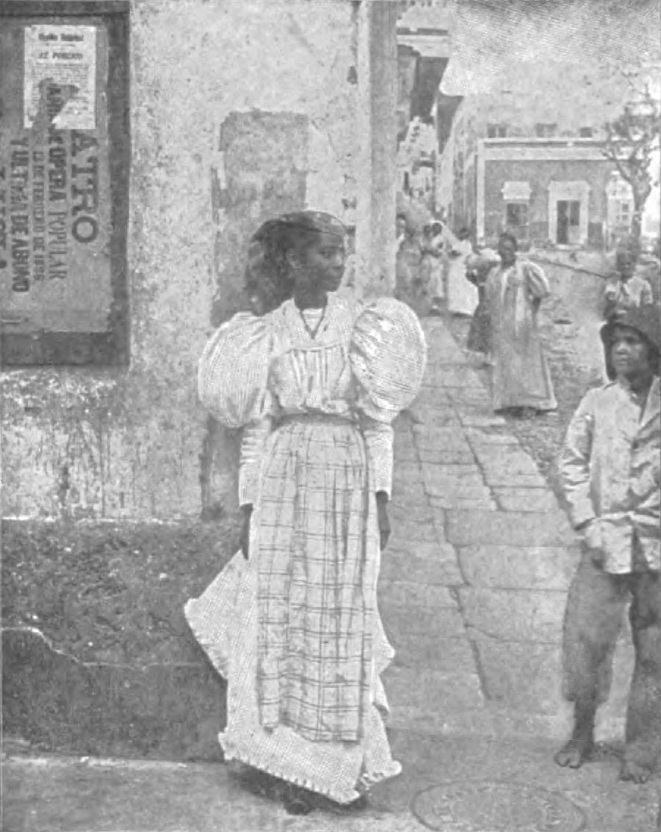
"Song of Myself" includes passages about the unsavory realities of the United States before the Civil War, including one about a multi-racial slave

The poem is written in Whitman's signature free verse style. Whitman, who praises words "simple as grass" (section 39) forgoes standard verse and stanza patterns in favor of a simple, legible style that can appeal to a mass audience.

Critics have noted a strong Transcendentalist influence on the poem. In section 32, for instance, Whitman writes, "I think I could turn and live with animals".

In addition to this romanticism, the poem seems to anticipate a kind of realism that would only become important in United States literature after the American Civil War. In the following passage, for example, one can see Whitman's inclusion of the gritty details of everyday life:

The lunatic is carried at last to the asylum a confirm'd case,

(He will never sleep any more as he did in the cot in his mother's bed-room)
The jour printer with gray head and gaunt jaws works at his case,
He turns his quid of tobacco while his eyes blurr with the manuscript;
The malform'd limbs are tied to the surgeon's table,
What is removed drops horribly in a pail;
The quadroon girl is sold at the auction-stand, the drunkard nods by the bar-room stove, (section 15)

== Themes in ‘Song of Myself’ ==
=== Politics and War ===
Whitman's "Song of Myself" presents an egalitarian vision of American society, challenging traditional social hierarchies through its emphasis on the shared humanity of individuals. In the opening section, Whitman writes, "For every atom belonging to me as good belongs to you", which establishes a connection between the speaker and the reader that suggests neither is inherently more valuable than the other, Literary scholar Corbett E. Upton argues that Whitman's democratic poetics avoid traditional hierarchies by presenting the speaker and reader as fundamentally alike, regardless of race, sex or social class. This approach reflects Whitman's attempt to create a democratic national identity in which ordinary individuals have equal significance.

Section 34 of "Song of Myself" recounts the Goliad Massacre of 1836, which took place during the Texas Revolution, rather than the American Civil War. At the time, Texas was part of Mexico, and Texan forces were fighting for independence. Following the Battle of Coleto, Texan soldiers under Colonel James W. Fannin Jr. surrendered to Mexican forces and were subsequently executed at Goliad on 27 March 1836. Whitman distinguishes this event from the better-known Battle of the Alamo, writing "I tell not the fall of Alamo", before recounting the deaths of the prisoners. His account presents the executions as a betrayal of the prisoners' surrender and emphasises the youth and humanity of those killed. The section introduces a complex relationship between the poem's treatment of war, its sympathy for individual suffering and its representation of American National Identity.

Whitman's portrayal of the Texan fighters in section 34 reflects his patriotism and his idealised vision of the American identity. By describing the Texan prisoners as "Large, turbulent, generous, handsome, proud and affectionate", Whitman emphasises qualities that align them with his vision of the America character. His focus on their youth and suffering presents their deaths as a tragedy, encouraging sympathy for the men and their cause. Although the prisoners fought for Texan independence from Mexico, Whitman's portrayal incorporates their sacrifice into a broader narrative of American national identity. Literary scholar Nathanael O'Reilly argues that Whitman's poetry constructs an idealised vision of America, suggesting that section 34 reflects not only his sympathy for the fallen soldiers but also his desire to define the qualities and values of the nation.

Additionally, O'Reilly states; "Whitman attempts to imagine an inclusive America that embraces all people and affords them equality and freedom; however, Whitman’s imagined America fails to provide equal rights for all people, excluding immigrants, Native Americans and African-Americans." This argument suggests, Whitman's patriotism presents an ideal of national unity that does not necessarily extend equally to all groups within American society.

=== Sex, Sexuality and Gender ===
Themes of sex and sexuality dominate Whitman’s Leaves of Grass and, in turn they are prevalent in "Song of Myself". These underlying concepts are present throughout the entire poem and have shaped the way the public viewed it and how it was received from the very beginning. Like many of Walt Whitman’s works, one of the main themes of "Song of Myself" is the exploration of sexuality through a non-heteronormative lens. Whitman writes about themes of ‘Manly Love’ and ‘Sexual Love’ throughout the stanzas, keeping an emphasis on the intensely passionate attraction and interaction.

Many critics and publications surrounding Whitman are able to come to the same conclusion, inferring his queerness from his writings, especially that of "Song of Myself". Such critics have made comments on Whitman himself "He had his neurotic side – covert, bisexual, quirky", and many viewed his poems and "Song of Myself" as a way to try and communicate his homosexuality to readers and the American public. While some critics who read "Song of Myself" tried to read in-between the lines to support their views of Whitman’s queerness, other critics, such as Michael Moon, and Byrne R.S. Fone, take Whitman at his word and assume that his sexuality is as it is directly presented through his form.

Whitman’s "Song of Myself" explores gender roles and the role of sexuality within the American woman throughout the verses. The way Whitman presents women within the stanza’s goes against traditional gender norms and this extends into his representation of female exploration and sexuality. Section 2 of the poem is the perfect example of Whitman’s portrayal of women’s sexual desire, following a woman watching as men bathe allowing her imagination to delve into the taboo.

The poet, Whitman, also speaks on gender inequality within the verse of "Song of Myself", he announces that he as a poet represents women as much as he does men, as well as speaking on how women and men should be equal;

I am the poet of the woman the same as the man,

And I say it is as great to be a woman as to be a man,
And I say there is nothing greater than the mother of men, (Section 21)

Another way that Whitman's sexuality is shown through the poem is through sensuality and the body:

Twenty-eight young men bathe by the shore,

An unseen hand also pass'd over their bodies,

It descended tremblingly from their temples and ribs

The young men float on their backs, their white bellies bulge to the sun (Section 11)

This section is an example of the sensual description that Whitman uses throughout his poem, maintaining the aesthetic of human nature and human body.

=== Class ===
Leaves of Grass as a book was aestheticised by Whitman to reach out to working class audiences. On the cover of the first edition of Leaves of Grass, his portrait, depicting him in casual attire with his head cocked, was opposite the title page.

This imagery would also be seen throughout the poem Song of Myself. Whitman divulges into not only what the wealthy classes do, but what their lifestyles are like in comparison to the proletariat:

Houses and rooms are full of perfumes, the shelves are

crowded with perfumes,

I breathe the fragrance myself and know it and like it,

The distillation would intoxicate me

I will go to the bank by the wood and become undisguised

and naked,

I am mad for it to be in contact with me. (Section 2)

Section 2 mentions the intoxicating and overly perfumed home in contrast to the natural air of the woods. It shows readers the experience of reality in nature as opposed to the rich man's house, which lacks substance and reality. This next section expresses class disparities in American Society that Whitman wanted to address, with this section being considered his strongest protest against the inequity of wealth among the working class.

To feed the greed of the belly the brains liberally spooning,

Tickets buying, taking, selling, but in the feast never once going,

Many sweating, ploughing, thrashing, and then the chaff for payment receiving, A few idly owning, and

they the wheat continually claiming. (Section 42)

Whitman uses this zombie-like language to paint a repulsive picture for readers that shows how greed and obsessive love of money is what causes such a disparity in wealth between classes.

== "Self" ==
In the poem, Whitman emphasizes an all-powerful "I" which serves as narrator, who should not be limited to or confused with the person of the historical Walt Whitman. The persona described has transcended the conventional boundaries of self: "I pass death with the dying and birth with the new-wash'd babe, and am not contain'd between my hat and boots" (section 7).

There are several other quotes from the poem that make it apparent that Whitman does not consider the narrator to represent a single individual. Rather, he seems to be narrating for all:

- "For every atom belonging to me as good belongs to you." (Section 1)
- "In all people I see myself, none more and not one a barleycorn less/And the good or bad I say of myself I say of them" (Section 20)
- "It is you talking just as much as myself, I act as the tongue of you" (Section 47)
- "Do I contradict myself? Very well then I contradict myself, (I am large, I contain multitudes.)" (Section 51)

Alice L. Cook and John B. Mason offer representative interpretations of the "self" as well as its importance in the poem. Cook writes that the key to understanding the poem lies in the "concept of self" (typified by Whitman) as "both individual and universal," while Mason discusses "the reader’s involvement in the poet’s movement from the singular to the cosmic". The "self" serves as a human ideal; in contrast to the archetypal self in epic poetry, this self is one of the common people rather than a hero. Nevertheless, Whitman locates heroism in every individual as an expression of the whole (the "leaf" among the "grass").

== Uses in other media ==
Canadian doctor and long-time Whitman friend Richard Maurice Bucke analyzed the poem in his influential and widely read 1898 book Cosmic Consciousness, as part of his investigation of the development of man's mystic relation to the infinite.

Simon Wilder delivers this poem to Monty Kessler in With Honors. Walt Whitman's work features prominently throughout the film, and Simon Wilder is often referred to as Walt Whitman's ghost.

A line from section 52 of the 1891-92 edition of "Song of Myself" is featured in the film Dead Poets Society, directed by Peter Weir. The line refers to the sounding of the "barbaric yawp", which illustrates the urgency of the film's protagonists and was read out to them by their English teacher John Keating, played by Robin Williams.

The poem figures in the plot of the 2008 young adult novel Paper Towns by John Green.

A documentary project, Whitman, Alabama, featured residents of Alabama reading Whitman verses on camera.

The poem is central to the plot of the play I and You by Lauren Gunderson.

"Song of Myself" was a major inspiration for the symphonic metal album Imaginaerum (2011) by Nightwish, as well as the fantasy film based on that album.

The poem is recited (or rather enacted) by lead character Will (played by Winston Duke) in the climatic closing scene of the 2020 movie Nine Days.

The quote '~~I am large,~~ I contain multitudes' from the poem is prominently featured as a thematic element in the movie The Life of Chuck (2024).

The quote 'I contain multitudes' from the poem is the title of the Bob Dylan song from "Rough and Rowdy Ways" and is taken from Section 51 of the poem "Song of Myself" by Walt Whitman.

== See also ==
- "I Contain Multitudes", a 2020 Bob Dylan song
