= Sinisterigone =

Scientific classification
- Kingdom: Animalia
- Phylum: Arthropoda
- Subphylum: Chelicerata
- Class: Arachnida
- Order: Araneae
- Infraorder: Araneomorphae
- Family: Linyphiidae
- Subfamily: Erigoninae
- Genus: Sinisterigone; Irfan, Zhang & Peng, 2022

Type species
- S. circularis Irfan, Zhang & Peng, 2022

Species
- 3, see text

Genus of spiders

Sinisterigone is a genus of spiders in the family Linyphiidae.

== Distribution ==
All described species are endemic to Yunnan Province of China.

== Etymology ==
The genus name is a combination of Latin sinister "left" and related genus Erigone. This refers to the embolus in the left male palp being curved clock-wise.

== Species ==
As of October 2025, this genus includes three species:

- Sinisterigone circularis Irfan, Zhang & Peng, 2022 – China (type species)
- Sinisterigone incurvata Irfan, Zhang & Peng, 2022 – China
- Sinisterigone rutunda Irfan, Zhang & Peng, 2022 – China
