= Vietnagone =

Scientific classification
- Kingdom: Animalia
- Phylum: Arthropoda
- Subphylum: Chelicerata
- Class: Arachnida
- Order: Araneae
- Infraorder: Araneomorphae
- Family: Linyphiidae
- Genus: Vietnagone; Tanasevitch, 2019

Type species
- V. silvatica Tanasevitch, 2019

Species
- Vietnagone rugulosa (Song & Li, 2010); Vietnagone silvatica Tanasevitch, 2019

Genus of spiders

Vietnagone is a small genus of Asian sheet weavers native to southeastern Tibet and northern Vietnam. It was erected by A. V. Tanasevitch in 2019 for one newly described species and one transferred from Gongylidium. They are relatively small spiders, ranging from 1.5 to 1.78 millimetres (0.059 to 0.070 in) long. The name is a combination of "Vietnam" and the genus Erigone, and as of April 2022 it contains only two species: V. rugulosa and V. silvatica.

== See also ==
- Gongylidium
