= Sinogone =

Scientific classification
- Kingdom: Animalia
- Phylum: Arthropoda
- Subphylum: Chelicerata
- Class: Arachnida
- Order: Araneae
- Infraorder: Araneomorphae
- Family: Linyphiidae
- Subfamily: Erigoninae
- Genus: Sinogone; Irfan, Wang & Zhang, 2023

Type species
- S. caesum Irfan, Wang & Zhang, 2023

Species
- 2, see text

Genus of spiders

Sinogone is a genus of spiders in the family Linyphiidae.

== Distribution ==
Both described species are endemic to China. S. caesum is found in Wuxi County, Chongqing; S. puteus in Badong County, Hubei Province.

== Etymology ==
The genus name is a contraction of the Latin prefix sino- "Chinese" and the related genus Erigone, indicating that this genus is part of subfamily Erigoninae.

The specific name of S. caesum is derived from Latin caesum "comma", indicating the anterior radical process of the embolic division of the palpal bulb. S. puteus is from Latin "well, cistern" (according to the authors "pit"), because of lateral pits behind the posterior eye in males.

== Species ==
As of October 2025, this genus includes two species:

- Sinogone caesum Irfan, Wang & Zhang, 2023 – China (type species)
- Sinogone puteus Irfan, Zhang & Peng, 2025 – China
