= Goneatara plausibilis =

Scientific classification
- Domain: Eukaryota
- Kingdom: Animalia
- Phylum: Arthropoda
- Subphylum: Chelicerata
- Class: Arachnida
- Order: Araneae
- Infraorder: Araneomorphae
- Family: Linyphiidae
- Genus: Goneatara
- Species: G. plausibilis

Binomial name
- Goneatara plausibilis Bishop & Crosby, 1935

Species of spider

Goneatara plausibilis is a species of dwarf spider in the family Linyphiidae. It is found in the United States.
