= Gracilentus =

Scientific classification
- Kingdom: Animalia
- Phylum: Arthropoda
- Subphylum: Chelicerata
- Class: Arachnida
- Order: Araneae
- Infraorder: Araneomorphae
- Family: Linyphiidae
- Subfamily: Erigoninae
- Genus: Gracilentus; Irfan, Zhang & Peng, 2022

Type species
- G. denticulatus Irfan, Zhang & Peng, 2022

Species
- 4, see text

Genus of spiders

Gracilentus is a genus of spiders in the family Linyphiidae.

== Distribution ==
All described species are endemic to China.

== Etymology ==
The genus is named Latin gracilentus "slender" (according to the authors "simple") for the simple paracymbium in the male palp.

G. denticulatus is named after the radix with teeth in the male palp. G. serratus is from Latin serratus "saw-edged", for the saw-shaped posterior margin of the ventral plate in the epigyne. G. tengchongensis is named after the type locality, Tengchong County (腾冲; Téngchōng) in Yunnan Province.

G. mangshanensis is named after its type locality, Mangshan (莽山; Mǎng shān) in Hunan Province.

== Species ==
As of October 2025, this genus includes four species:

- Gracilentus denticulatus Irfan, Zhang & Peng, 2022 – China (type species)
- Gracilentus mangshanensis Irfan, Zhang & Peng, 2025 – China
- Gracilentus serratus Irfan, Zhang & Peng, 2022 – China
- Gracilentus tenchongensis Irfan, Zhang & Peng, 2022 – China
