= Praestigia kulczynskii =

Scientific classification
- Domain: Eukaryota
- Kingdom: Animalia
- Phylum: Arthropoda
- Subphylum: Chelicerata
- Class: Arachnida
- Order: Araneae
- Infraorder: Araneomorphae
- Family: Linyphiidae
- Genus: Praestigia
- Species: P. kulczynskii

Binomial name
- Praestigia kulczynskii Eskov, 1979

Species of spider

Praestigia kulczynskii is a species of dwarf spider in the family Linyphiidae. It is found in Russia, Japan, and Canada.
