= Tapinocyba simplex =

Scientific classification
- Domain: Eukaryota
- Kingdom: Animalia
- Phylum: Arthropoda
- Subphylum: Chelicerata
- Class: Arachnida
- Order: Araneae
- Infraorder: Araneomorphae
- Family: Linyphiidae
- Genus: Tapinocyba
- Species: T. simplex

Binomial name
- Tapinocyba simplex (Emerton, 1882)

Species of spider

Tapinocyba simplex is a species of dwarf spider in the family Linyphiidae. It is found in the USA.
