= Coreorgonal monoceros =

Scientific classification
- Domain: Eukaryota
- Kingdom: Animalia
- Phylum: Arthropoda
- Subphylum: Chelicerata
- Class: Arachnida
- Order: Araneae
- Infraorder: Araneomorphae
- Family: Linyphiidae
- Genus: Coreorgonal
- Species: C. monoceros

Binomial name
- Coreorgonal monoceros (Keyserling, 1884)

Species of spider

Coreorgonal monoceros is a species of dwarf spider in the family Linyphiidae. It is found in the United States.
