= Erigone dentosa =

Scientific classification
- Domain: Eukaryota
- Kingdom: Animalia
- Phylum: Arthropoda
- Subphylum: Chelicerata
- Class: Arachnida
- Order: Araneae
- Infraorder: Araneomorphae
- Family: Linyphiidae
- Genus: Erigone
- Species: E. dentosa

Binomial name
- Erigone dentosa O. P.-Cambridge, 1894

Species of spider

Erigone dentosa is a species of dwarf spider in the family Linyphiidae. It is found in a range from the United States to Guatemala and has been introduced into Belgium.
