= Sisicus penifusifer =

Scientific classification
- Domain: Eukaryota
- Kingdom: Animalia
- Phylum: Arthropoda
- Subphylum: Chelicerata
- Class: Arachnida
- Order: Araneae
- Infraorder: Araneomorphae
- Family: Linyphiidae
- Genus: Sisicus
- Species: S. penifusifer

Binomial name
- Sisicus penifusifer Bishop & Crosby, 1938

Species of spider

Sisicus penifusifer is a species of dwarf spider in the family Linyphiidae. It is found in the United States and Canada.
