= Dicristatus =

Scientific classification
- Kingdom: Animalia
- Phylum: Arthropoda
- Subphylum: Chelicerata
- Class: Arachnida
- Order: Araneae
- Infraorder: Araneomorphae
- Family: Linyphiidae
- Subfamily: Erigoninae
- Genus: Dicristatus; Irfan, Wang & Zhang, 2023

Type species
- D. minutus Irfan, Wang & Zhang, 2023

Species
- 4, see text

Genus of spiders

Dicristatus is a genus of spiders in the family Linyphiidae.

== Distribution ==
Dicristatus is endemic to China.

== Etymology ==
The original authors do not explain the origin of the genus name.

== Species ==
As of October 2025, this genus includes four species:

- Dicristatus cordatus Irfan, Zhang & Peng, 2025 – China
- Dicristatus denticulatus Irfan, Zhang & Peng, 2025 – China
- Dicristatus minutus Irfan, Wang & Zhang, 2023 – China (type species)
- Dicristatus modaoxiensis Irfan, Wang & Zhang, 2023 – China
