= Hybauchenidium cymbadentatum =

Scientific classification
- Domain: Eukaryota
- Kingdom: Animalia
- Phylum: Arthropoda
- Subphylum: Chelicerata
- Class: Arachnida
- Order: Araneae
- Infraorder: Araneomorphae
- Family: Linyphiidae
- Genus: Hybauchenidium
- Species: H. cymbadentatum

Binomial name
- Hybauchenidium cymbadentatum (Crosby & Bishop, 1935)

Species of spider

Hybauchenidium cymbadentatum is a species of dwarf spider in the family Linyphiidae. It is found in the United States.
