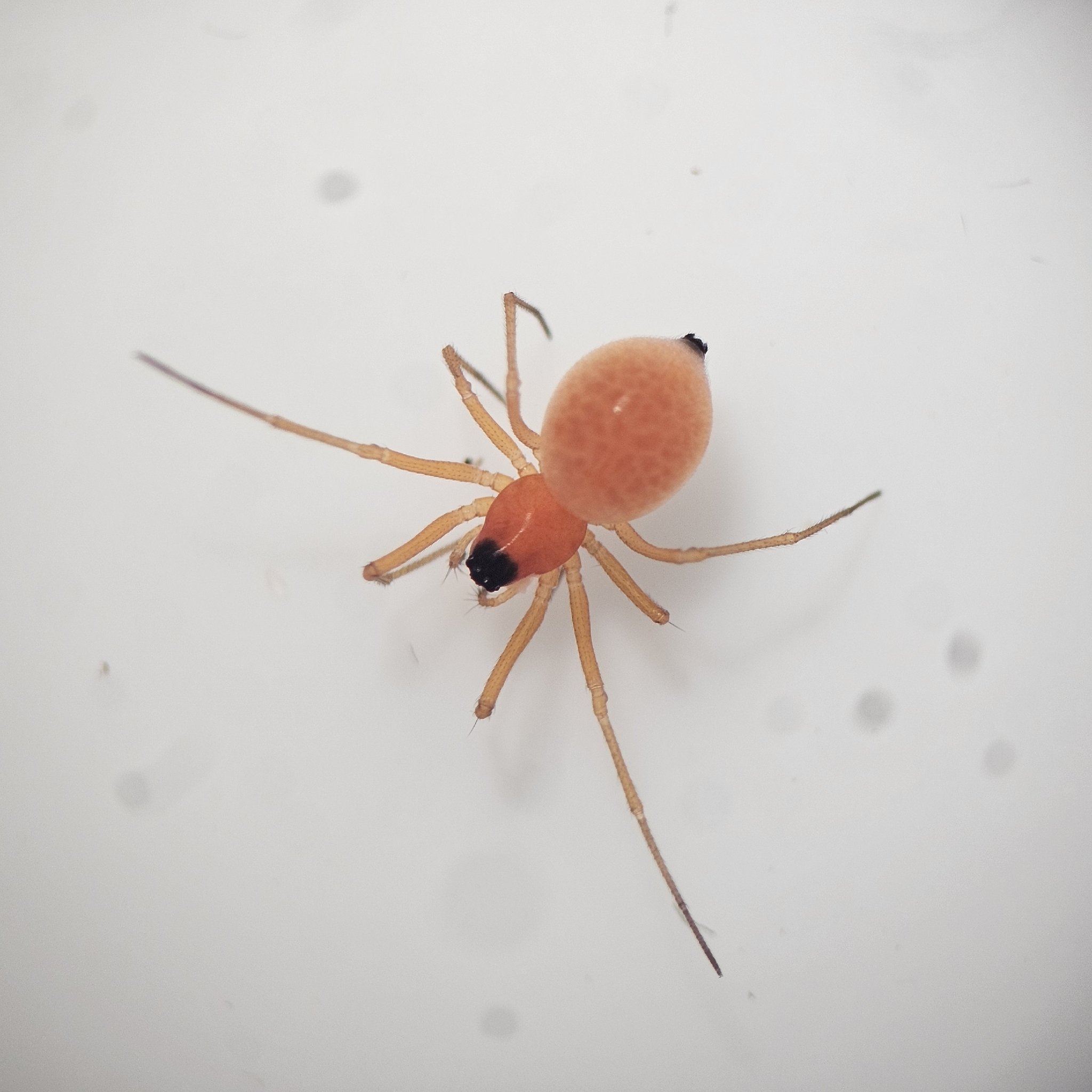

Scientific classification
- Kingdom: Animalia
- Phylum: Arthropoda
- Subphylum: Chelicerata
- Class: Arachnida
- Order: Araneae
- Infraorder: Araneomorphae
- Family: Linyphiidae
- Genus: Ceratinopsis
- Species: C. interpres

Binomial name
- Ceratinopsis interpres (O. P.-Cambridge, 1874)

= Ceratinopsis interpres =

Species of spider

Ceratinopsis interpres is a species of dwarf spider in the family Linyphiidae. It is found in the United States.
