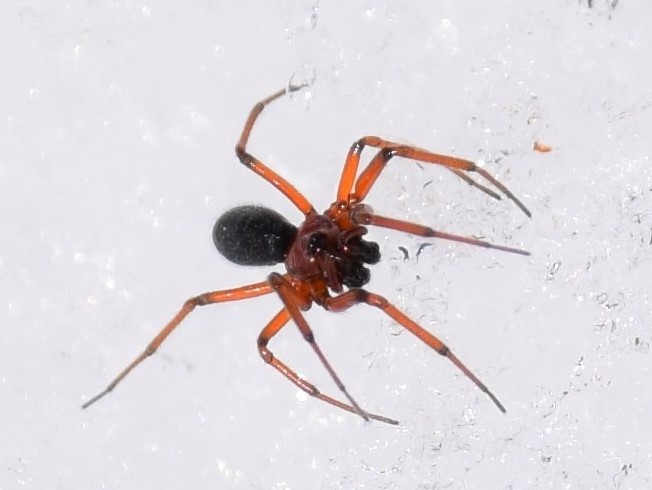

Scientific classification
- Kingdom: Animalia
- Phylum: Arthropoda
- Subphylum: Chelicerata
- Class: Arachnida
- Order: Araneae
- Infraorder: Araneomorphae
- Family: Linyphiidae
- Genus: Zornella
- Species: Z. armata

Binomial name
- Zornella armata (Banks, 1906)

= Zornella armata =

Species of spider

Zornella armata is a species of dwarf spider in the family Linyphiidae. It is found in the United States and Canada.
