= Collinsia plumosa =

Conservation status
- Secure (NatureServe)

Scientific classification
- Kingdom: Animalia
- Phylum: Arthropoda
- Subphylum: Chelicerata
- Class: Arachnida
- Order: Araneae
- Infraorder: Araneomorphae
- Family: Linyphiidae
- Genus: Collinsia
- Species: C. plumosa

Binomial name
- Collinsia plumosa (Emerton, 1882)

Species of spider

Collinsia plumosa is a species of dwarf spider in the family Linyphiidae. It is found in the United States and Canada.
