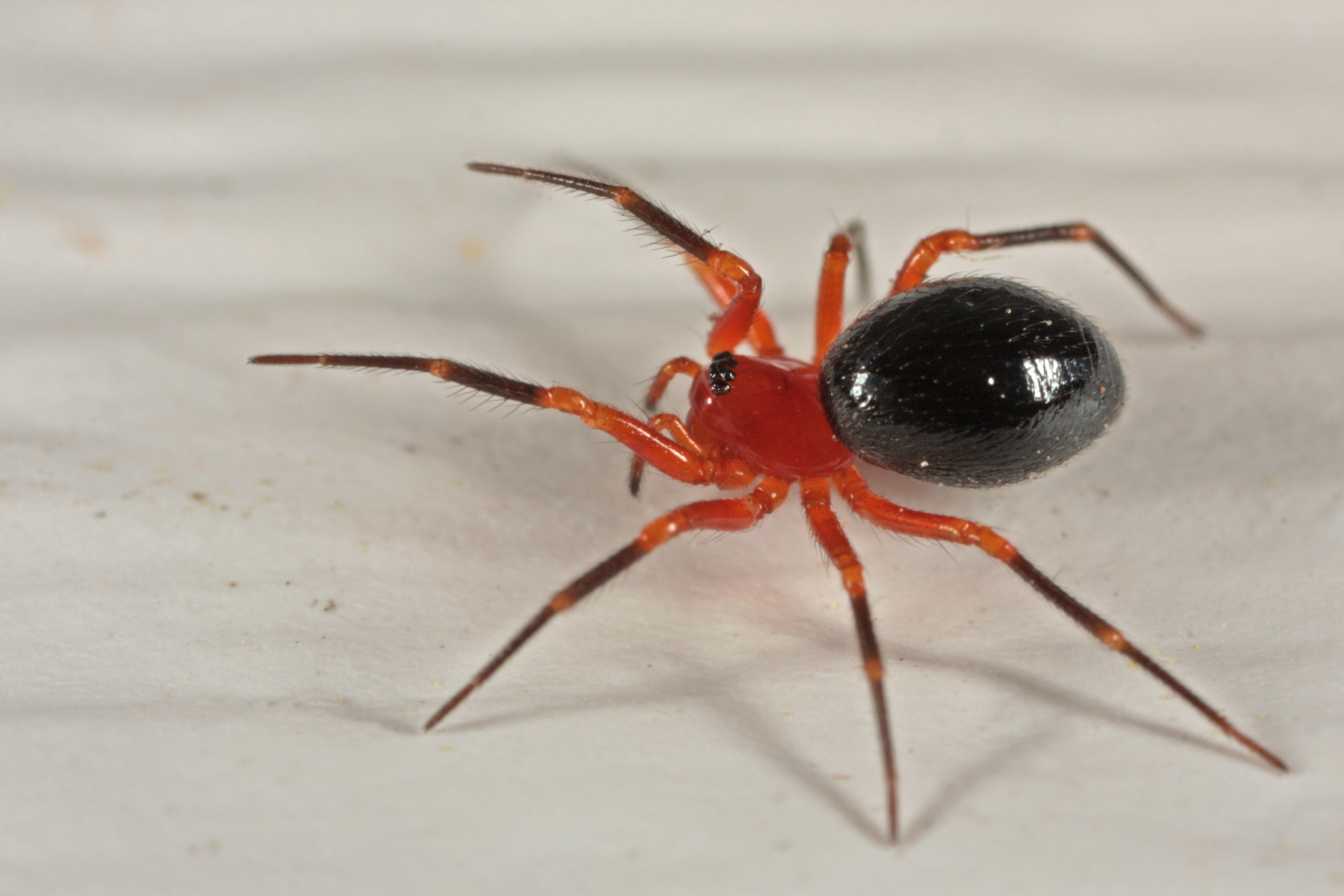

Scientific classification
- Kingdom: Animalia
- Phylum: Arthropoda
- Subphylum: Chelicerata
- Class: Arachnida
- Order: Araneae
- Infraorder: Araneomorphae
- Family: Linyphiidae
- Genus: Hypselistes
- Species: H. florens

Binomial name
- Hypselistes florens (O. P.-Cambridge, 1875)

= Hypselistes florens =

Species of spider

Hypselistes florens is a species of dwarf spider in the family Linyphiidae. It is found in the United States and Canada.

== Subspecies ==
These two subspecies belong to the species Hypselistes florens:

- (Hypselistes florens florens) (O. P.-Cambridge, 1875)
- Hypselistes florens bulbiceps Chamberlin & Ivie, 1935
