= Hybauchenidium gibbosum =

Scientific classification
- Domain: Eukaryota
- Kingdom: Animalia
- Phylum: Arthropoda
- Subphylum: Chelicerata
- Class: Arachnida
- Order: Araneae
- Infraorder: Araneomorphae
- Family: Linyphiidae
- Genus: Hybauchenidium
- Species: H. gibbosum

Binomial name
- Hybauchenidium gibbosum (Sorensen, 1898)

Species of spider

Hybauchenidium gibbosum is a species of dwarf spider in the family Linyphiidae. It is found in Russia, Canada, the United States, and Greenland.
