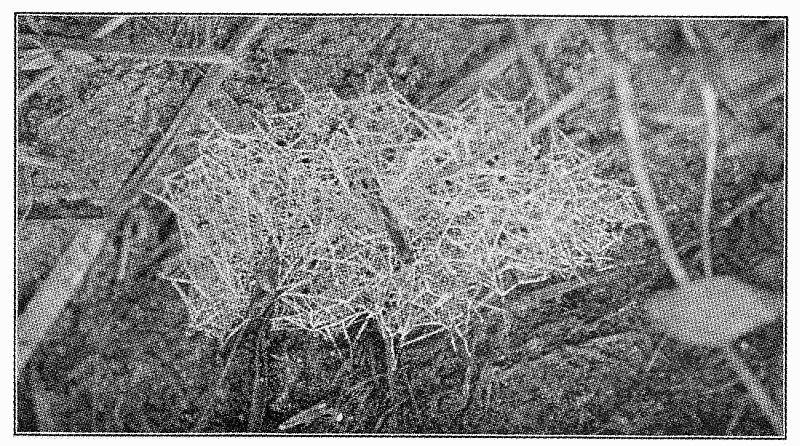

Scientific classification
- Domain: Eukaryota
- Kingdom: Animalia
- Phylum: Arthropoda
- Subphylum: Chelicerata
- Class: Arachnida
- Order: Araneae
- Infraorder: Araneomorphae
- Family: Linyphiidae
- Genus: Erigone
- Species: E. dentigera

Binomial name
- Erigone dentigera O. Pickard-Cambridge, 1874

= Erigone dentigera =

Species of spider

Erigone dentigera is a species of dwarf spider in the family Linyphiidae. It is found in North America, Europe, Caucasus, and Russia (Far East).
