= Sinopimoa =

Scientific classification
- Kingdom: Animalia
- Phylum: Arthropoda
- Subphylum: Chelicerata
- Class: Arachnida
- Order: Araneae
- Infraorder: Araneomorphae
- Family: Linyphiidae
- Genus: Sinopimoa; Li & Wunderlich, 2008
- Species: S. bicolor

Binomial name
- Sinopimoa bicolor Li & Wunderlich, 2008

Genus of spiders

Sinopimoa is a monotypic genus of Chinese sheet weavers containing the single species, Sinopimoa bicolor. It was first described by S. Q. Li & J. Wunderlich in 2008, and is found in China. It was originally placed in its own family (Sinopimoidae) but is now considered a member of the Linyphiidae, and it may be a member of the Erigoninae.
