= Ceratinopsis nigriceps =

Scientific classification
- Domain: Eukaryota
- Kingdom: Animalia
- Phylum: Arthropoda
- Subphylum: Chelicerata
- Class: Arachnida
- Order: Araneae
- Infraorder: Araneomorphae
- Family: Linyphiidae
- Genus: Ceratinopsis
- Species: C. nigriceps

Binomial name
- Ceratinopsis nigriceps Emerton, 1882

Species of spider

Ceratinopsis nigriceps is a species of dwarf spider in the family Linyphiidae. It is found in the United States and Canada.
