= Erigokhabarum =

Scientific classification
- Kingdom: Animalia
- Phylum: Arthropoda
- Subphylum: Chelicerata
- Class: Arachnida
- Order: Araneae
- Infraorder: Araneomorphae
- Family: Linyphiidae
- Genus: Erigokhabarum; Tanasevitch, 2022
- Species: E. articulatum

Binomial name
- Erigokhabarum articulatum Tanasevitch, 2022

Species of spider

Erigokhabarum is a monotypic genus of spiders in the family Linyphiidae containing the single species, Erigokhabarum articulatum.

The species is only known from a male specimen of 1.63 mm body length, which was found in Populus forest of the confluence of Pravaya and Levaya Bureya rivers, in Khabarovsk Province of Russia's Far East.

== Etymology ==
The genus name refers to the genus' positioning within the Erigoninae, and its area of origin, Khabarovsk Province. The species is named after the partitioned radix in the embolic division of the male palp.
