= Ceratinopsis labradorensis =

Scientific classification
- Domain: Eukaryota
- Kingdom: Animalia
- Phylum: Arthropoda
- Subphylum: Chelicerata
- Class: Arachnida
- Order: Araneae
- Infraorder: Araneomorphae
- Family: Linyphiidae
- Genus: Ceratinopsis
- Species: C. labradorensis

Binomial name
- Ceratinopsis labradorensis Emerton, 1925

Species of spider

Ceratinopsis labradorensis is a species of dwarf spider in the family Linyphiidae. It is found in Canada.
