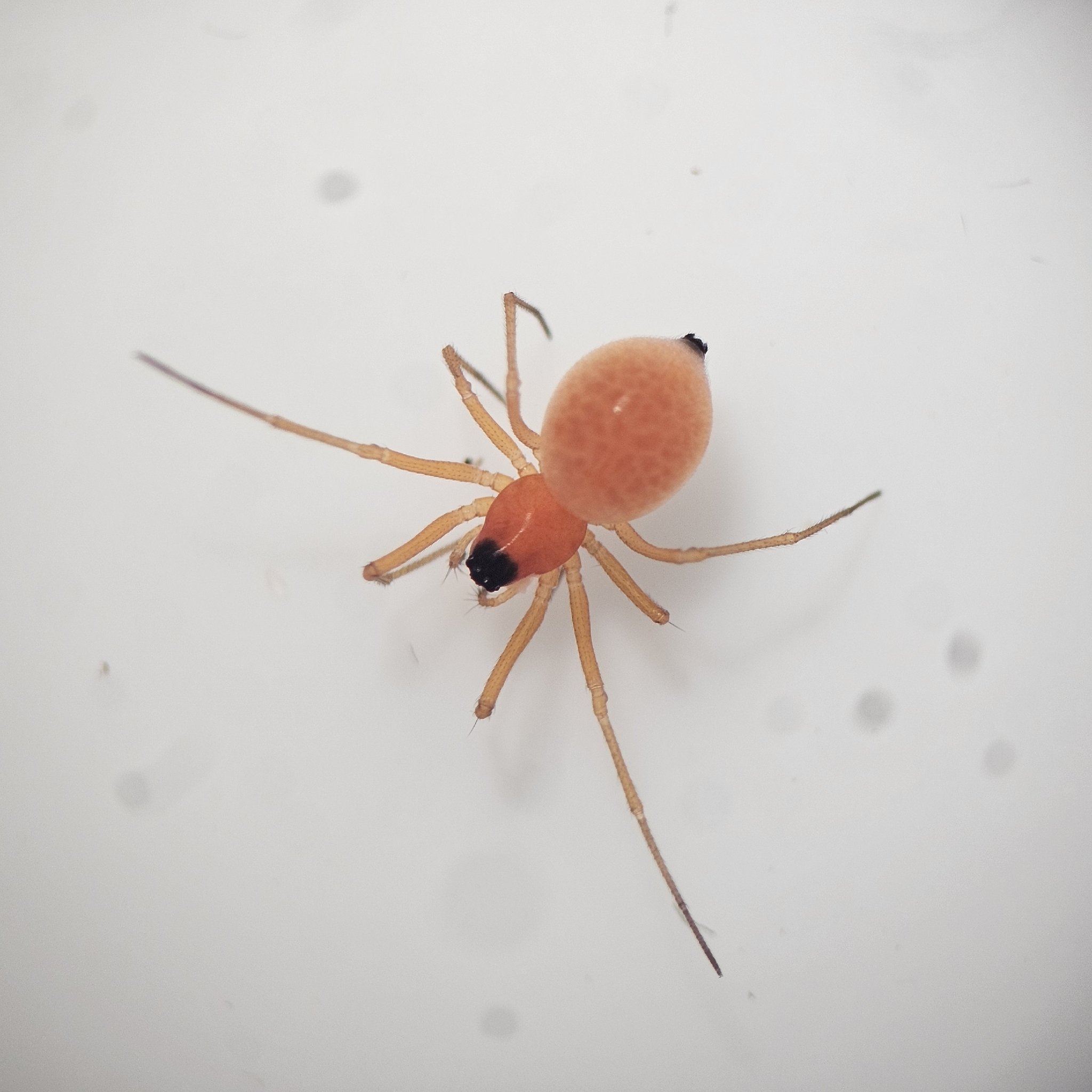
- Ceratinopsis interpres

Scientific classification
- Kingdom: Animalia
- Phylum: Arthropoda
- Subphylum: Chelicerata
- Class: Arachnida
- Order: Araneae
- Infraorder: Araneomorphae
- Family: Linyphiidae
- Subfamily: Erigoninae
- Genus: Ceratinopsis; Emerton, 1882

Type species
- C. interpres (O. Pickard-Cambridge, 1874)

Species
- 44, see text

= Ceratinopsis =

Genus of spiders

Ceratinopsis is a genus of dwarf spiders that was first described by James Henry Emerton in 1882.

== Species ==
As of October 2025, this genus includes 44 species:

- Ceratinopsis acripes (Denis, 1962) – Canary Islands, Madeira
- Ceratinopsis africana (Holm, 1962) – Gabon, Kenya
- Ceratinopsis atolma Chamberlin, 1925 – United States
- Ceratinopsis auriculata Emerton, 1909 – Canada, United States
- Ceratinopsis benoiti (Holm, 1968) – Tanzania
- Ceratinopsis blesti Locket, 1982 – Singapore
- Ceratinopsis bona Chamberlin & Ivie, 1944 – United States
- Ceratinopsis crosbyi Chamberlin, 1949 – United States
- Ceratinopsis delicata Chamberlin & Ivie, 1939 – United States
- Ceratinopsis dippenaarae Jocqué, 1984 – South Africa
- Ceratinopsis disparata (Dondale, 1959) – United States
- Ceratinopsis fako Bosmans & Jocqué, 1983 – Cameroon
- Ceratinopsis georgiana Chamberlin & Ivie, 1944 – United States
- Ceratinopsis gosibia Chamberlin, 1949 – United States
- Ceratinopsis guerrerensis Gertsch & Davis, 1937 – Mexico
- Ceratinopsis holmi Jocqué, 1981 – Malawi, Tanzania
- Ceratinopsis idanrensis Locket & Russell-Smith, 1980 – Nigeria, Botswana
- Ceratinopsis infuscata (Denis, 1962) – Madeira
- Ceratinopsis interpres (O. Pickard-Cambridge, 1874) – Canada, United States (type species)
- Ceratinopsis interventa Chamberlin, 1949 – United States
- Ceratinopsis labradorensis Emerton, 1925 – Canada
- Ceratinopsis laticeps Emerton, 1882 – Canada, United States
- Ceratinopsis locketi Millidge, 1995 – Indonesia (Krakatau)
- Ceratinopsis machadoi (Miller, 1970) – Nigeria, Angola
- Ceratinopsis mbamensis Bosmans, 1988 – Cameroon
- Ceratinopsis monticola (Simon, 1894) – Sri Lanka
- Ceratinopsis munda (O. Pickard-Cambridge, 1896) – Guatemala
- Ceratinopsis nigriceps Emerton, 1882 – Canada, United States
- Ceratinopsis nigripalpis Emerton, 1882 – Canada, United States
- Ceratinopsis nitida (Holm, 1964) – Cameroon, DR Congo
- Ceratinopsis oregonicola Chamberlin, 1949 – United States
- Ceratinopsis orientalis Locket, 1982 – Laos, Malaysia (peninsula), Indonesia (Java)
- Ceratinopsis palomara Chamberlin, 1949 – United States
- Ceratinopsis raboeli Scharff, 1989 – Kenya
- Ceratinopsis rosea Banks, 1898 – Mexico
- Ceratinopsis secuta Chamberlin, 1949 – United States
- Ceratinopsis setoensis (Oi, 1960) – Korea, Japan
- Ceratinopsis sinuata Bosmans, 1988 – Cameroon
- Ceratinopsis sutoris Bishop & Crosby, 1930 – Canada, United States
- Ceratinopsis swanea Chamberlin & Ivie, 1944 – United States
- Ceratinopsis sylvania Chamberlin & Ivie, 1944 – United States
- Ceratinopsis watsinga Chamberlin, 1949 – United States
- Ceratinopsis xanthippe (Keyserling, 1886) – United States
- Ceratinopsis yola Chamberlin & Ivie, 1939 – United States
