= Erigone blaesa =

Scientific classification
- Domain: Eukaryota
- Kingdom: Animalia
- Phylum: Arthropoda
- Subphylum: Chelicerata
- Class: Arachnida
- Order: Araneae
- Infraorder: Araneomorphae
- Family: Linyphiidae
- Genus: Erigone
- Species: E. blaesa

Binomial name
- Erigone blaesa Crosby & Bishop, 1928

Species of spider

Erigone blaesa is a species of dwarf spider in the family Linyphiidae. It is found in the USA and Canada.
