= Auriculaiana =

Scientific classification
- Kingdom: Animalia
- Phylum: Arthropoda
- Subphylum: Chelicerata
- Class: Arachnida
- Order: Araneae
- Infraorder: Araneomorphae
- Family: Linyphiidae
- Subfamily: Erigoninae
- Genus: Auriculaiana; Irfan, Zhang & Peng, 2023

Type species
- Auricula triangularis Irfan, Zhang & Peng, 2022

Species
- 5, see text

Genus of spiders

Auriculaiana is a genus of spiders in the family Linyphiidae.

== Distribution ==
All described species are endemic to China.

== Taxonomy ==
The genus was originally described as Auricula in 2022. After this name turned out to be preoccupied by a genus of Gastropoda, it was renamed to Auriculaiana in 2023. The name is from Latin auricula "lobe", referring to the cephalic lobe in the male, the distinguishing characteristic against other genera in the subfamily Erigoninae.

A. aeda is from Latin aedis "tomb", referring to the tomb-shaped cephalic lobe of the male. A. rutunda is a misspelling of Latin rotundus "round", referring to the globular spermathecae in the epigyne. A. sanchaheensis refers to the type locality of the species, Sanchahe (三岔河; Sān chà hé) Nature Reserve in Yunnan. A. triangularis is named for the triangular shaped cephalic lobe in the male. A. yongshunensis is named after its type locality Yongshun County (永顺; Yǒng shùn) in Hunan Province.

== Species ==
As of October 2025, this genus includes five species:

- Auriculaiana aeda (Irfan, Zhang & Peng, 2022) – China
- Auriculaiana rutunda (Irfan, Zhang & Peng, 2022) – China
- Auriculaiana sanchaheensis (Irfan, Zhang & Peng, 2022) – China
- Auriculaiana triangularis (Irfan, Zhang & Peng, 2022) – China (type species)
- Auriculaiana yongshunensis Irfan, Zhang & Peng, 2025 – China
