= Mythoplastoides exiguus =

Scientific classification
- Domain: Eukaryota
- Kingdom: Animalia
- Phylum: Arthropoda
- Subphylum: Chelicerata
- Class: Arachnida
- Order: Araneae
- Infraorder: Araneomorphae
- Family: Linyphiidae
- Genus: Mythoplastoides
- Species: M. exiguus

Binomial name
- Mythoplastoides exiguus (Banks, 1892)

Species of spider

Mythoplastoides exiguus is a species of dwarf spider in the family Linyphiidae. It is found in the United States.
