= Wulinggone =

Scientific classification
- Kingdom: Animalia
- Phylum: Arthropoda
- Subphylum: Chelicerata
- Class: Arachnida
- Order: Araneae
- Infraorder: Araneomorphae
- Family: Linyphiidae
- Genus: Wulinggone; Irfan, Zhang & Peng, 2025
- Species: W. qizimeiensis

Binomial name
- Wulinggone qizimeiensis Irfan, Zhang & Peng, 2025

Species of spider

Wulinggone is a monotypic genus of spiders in the family Linyphiidae containing the single species, Wulinggone qizimeiensis.

== Distribution ==
Wulinggone qizimeiensis has been recorded from China (Chongqing and Hubei Province).

== Etymology ==
The genus name is a contraction of Wuling Mountains (武陵; Wǔlíng) in Central China, where the species has been found, and related genus Erigone.

The specific name refers to the type locality, Qizimei Mountain (七姊妹; Qī zǐmèi, "seven sisters") in Hubei Province.
