= Mythoplastoides =

Scientific classification
- Kingdom: Animalia
- Phylum: Arthropoda
- Subphylum: Chelicerata
- Class: Arachnida
- Order: Araneae
- Infraorder: Araneomorphae
- Family: Linyphiidae
- Genus: Mythoplastoides; Crosby & Bishop, 1933

Type species
- M. exiguus (Banks, 1892)

Species
- 2, see text

Genus of spiders

Mythoplastoides is a genus of North American dwarf spiders that was first described by C. R. Crosby & S. C. Bishop in 1933.

== Species ==
As of May 2019 it contains two species:

- Mythoplastoides erectus (Emerton, 1915) – USA
- Mythoplastoides exiguus (Banks, 1892) (type) – USA
