= Erigone wiltoni =

Scientific classification
- Domain: Eukaryota
- Kingdom: Animalia
- Phylum: Arthropoda
- Subphylum: Chelicerata
- Class: Arachnida
- Order: Araneae
- Infraorder: Araneomorphae
- Family: Linyphiidae
- Genus: Erigone
- Species: E. wiltoni

Binomial name
- Erigone wiltoni Locket, 1973

Species of spider

Erigone wiltoni is a species of sheet weaver spider.

== Taxonomy ==
This species was described in 1973 by George Hazelwood Locket.

== Distribution ==
This species is known from New Zealand and the Comoros.
