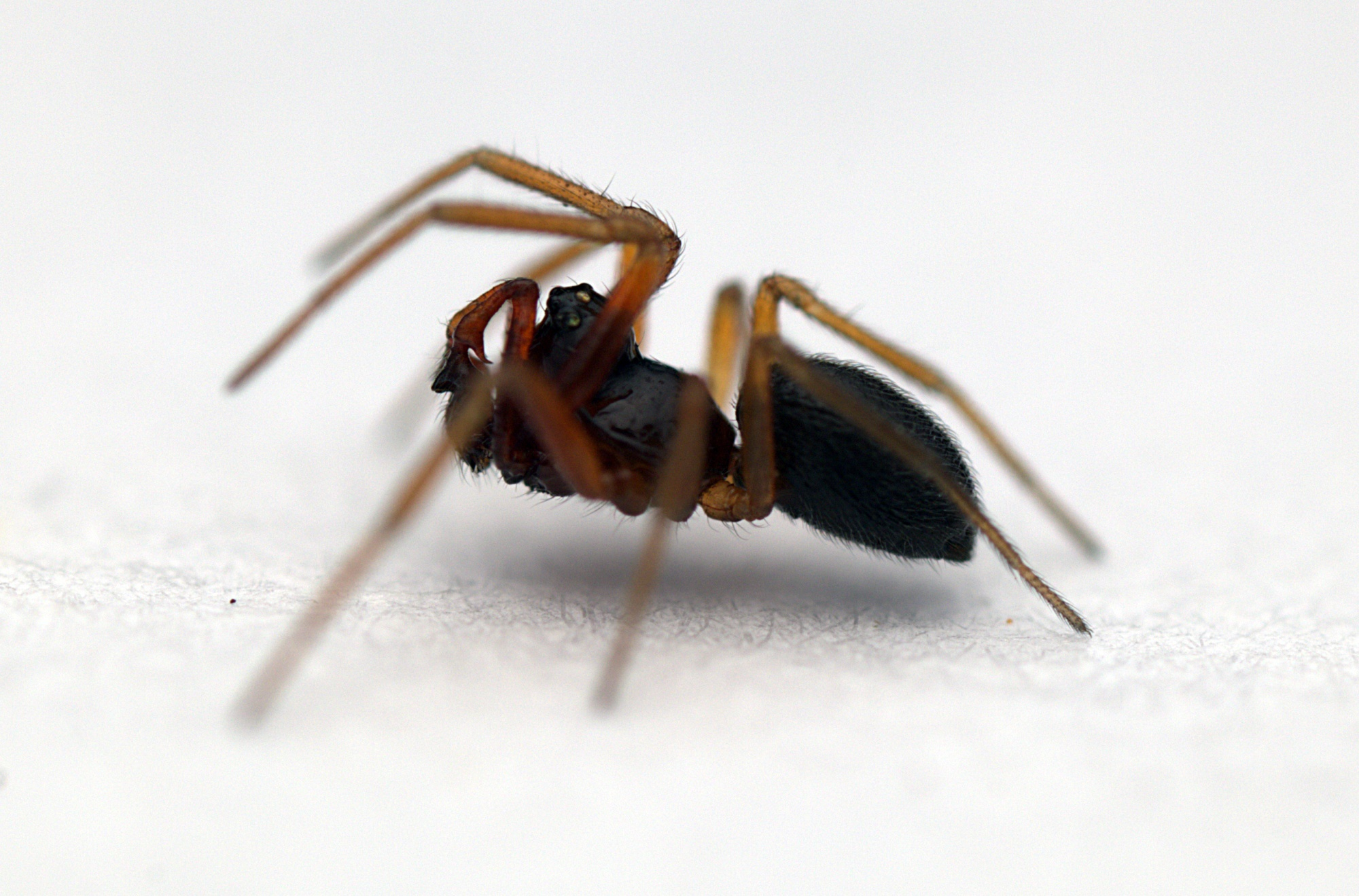

Scientific classification
- Kingdom: Animalia
- Phylum: Arthropoda
- Subphylum: Chelicerata
- Class: Arachnida
- Order: Araneae
- Infraorder: Araneomorphae
- Family: Linyphiidae
- Genus: Erigone
- Species: E. prominens

Binomial name
- Erigone prominens Bösenberg & Strand, 1906

Synonyms
- Erigone doenitzi; Erigone ourania; Erigone riparia

= Erigone prominens =

Species of spider

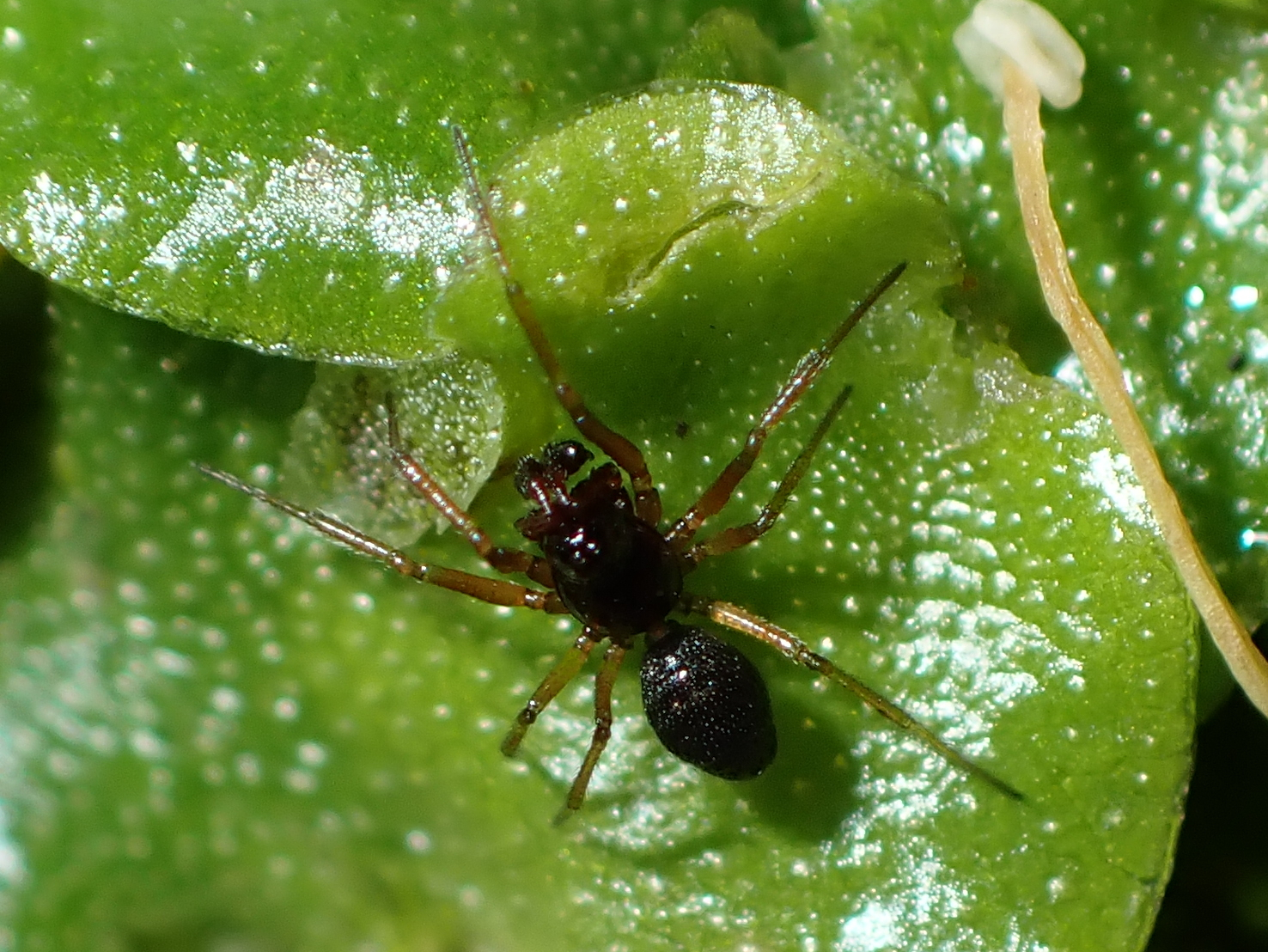
E. prominens seen in Avondale, Auckland, New Zealand

Erigone prominens is a species of sheet weaver spider.

== Taxonomy ==
This species was described in 1906 by Friedrich Wilhelm Bösenberg and Embrik Strand.

== Distribution ==
This species is known from Asia. It has also been introduced to Africa, Australia, New Zealand.
