= Hybauchenidium =

Scientific classification
- Kingdom: Animalia
- Phylum: Arthropoda
- Subphylum: Chelicerata
- Class: Arachnida
- Order: Araneae
- Infraorder: Araneomorphae
- Family: Linyphiidae
- Genus: Hybauchenidium; Holm, 1973

Type species
- H. aquilonare (L. Koch, 1879)

Species
- 4, see text

Genus of spiders

Hybauchenidium is a genus of dwarf spiders that was first described by Å. Holm in 1973.

== Species ==
As of May 2019 it contains four species, found in Canada, Finland, Greenland, Russia, Sweden, and the United States:

- Hybauchenidium aquilonare (L. Koch, 1879) (type) – Russia (Europe to Far North-East), USA (Alaska), Canada
- Hybauchenidium cymbadentatum (Crosby & Bishop, 1935) – USA
- Hybauchenidium ferrumequinum (Grube, 1861) – Sweden, Finland, Russia (Europe to Far North-East), Canada
- Hybauchenidium gibbosum (Sørensen, 1898) – Russia (north-eastern Siberia, Far North-East), Canada, USA, Greenland
