= Atypena ellioti =

Scientific classification
- Kingdom: Animalia
- Phylum: Arthropoda
- Subphylum: Chelicerata
- Class: Arachnida
- Order: Araneae
- Infraorder: Araneomorphae
- Family: Linyphiidae
- Genus: Atypena
- Species: A. ellioti

Binomial name
- Atypena ellioti Jocqué, 1983

Species of spider

Atypena ellioti is a species of spider of the genus Atypena. It is endemic to Sri Lanka.
