= Zornella =

Scientific classification
- Kingdom: Animalia
- Phylum: Arthropoda
- Subphylum: Chelicerata
- Class: Arachnida
- Order: Araneae
- Infraorder: Araneomorphae
- Family: Linyphiidae
- Genus: Zornella; Jackson, 1932

Type species
- Z. cultrigera (L. Koch, 1879)

Species
- 3, see text

Synonyms
- Pseudogonatium Strand, 1901

Genus of spiders

Zornella is a genus of sheet weavers that was first described by A. R. Jackson in 1932.

== Species ==
As of June 2019 it contains three species:

- Zornella armata (Banks, 1906) – USA, Canada
- Zornella cryptodon (Chamberlin, 1920) – USA, Canada
- Zornella cultrigera (L. Koch, 1879) – NE Europe, Russia to Kazakhstan, Mongolia
