= Glyphesis =

Scientific classification
- Kingdom: Animalia
- Phylum: Arthropoda
- Subphylum: Chelicerata
- Class: Arachnida
- Order: Araneae
- Infraorder: Araneomorphae
- Family: Linyphiidae
- Genus: Glyphesis; Simon, 1926

Type species
- G. servulus (Simon, 1881)

Species
- 7, see text

Genus of spiders

Glyphesis is a genus of dwarf spiders that was first described by Eugène Louis Simon in 1926.

== Species ==
As of May 2019 it contains seven species, found in Canada, Denmark, Germany, Hungary, Japan, Poland, Russia, Slovakia, Ukraine, and the United States:

- Glyphesis asiaticus Eskov, 1989 – Russia (Middle Siberia to Far East)
- Glyphesis cottonae (La Touche, 1946) – Europe, Russia (Europe to West Siberia), Japan
- Glyphesis idahoanus (Chamberlin, 1949) – USA
- Glyphesis nemoralis Esyunin & Efimik, 1994 – Ukraine, Russia (Europe)
- Glyphesis scopulifer (Emerton, 1882) – USA, Canada
- Glyphesis servulus (Simon, 1881) (type) – Europe
- Glyphesis taoplesius Wunderlich, 1969 – Denmark, Germany, Poland, Slovakia, Hungary, Russia (Europe)
