= Eridantes =

Scientific classification
- Kingdom: Animalia
- Phylum: Arthropoda
- Subphylum: Chelicerata
- Class: Arachnida
- Order: Araneae
- Infraorder: Araneomorphae
- Family: Linyphiidae
- Subfamily: Erigoninae
- Genus: Eridantes; Crosby & Bishop, 1933

Type species
- E. erigonoides (Emerton, 1882)

Species
- E. diodontos Prentice & Redak, 2013 – USA, Mexico; E. erigonoides (Emerton, 1882) – USA; E. utibilis Crosby & Bishop, 1933 – USA, Canada

Genus of spiders

Eridantes is a genus of North American dwarf spiders that was first described by C. R. Crosby & S. C. Bishop in 1933. As of May 2019 it contains only three species: E. diodontos, E. erigonoides, and E. utibilis.
