= Goneatara =

Scientific classification
- Kingdom: Animalia
- Phylum: Arthropoda
- Subphylum: Chelicerata
- Class: Arachnida
- Order: Araneae
- Infraorder: Araneomorphae
- Family: Linyphiidae
- Genus: Goneatara; Bishop & Crosby, 1935

Type species
- G. platyrhinus (Crosby & Bishop, 1927)

Species
- 4, see text

Genus of spiders

Goneatara is a genus of North American dwarf spiders that was first described by S. C. Bishop & C. R. Crosby in 1935.

== Species ==
As of May 2019 it contains four species, found in the United States:

- Goneatara eranistes (Crosby & Bishop, 1927) – USA
- Goneatara nasutus (Barrows, 1943) – USA
- Goneatara platyrhinus (Crosby & Bishop, 1927) (type) – USA
- Goneatara plausibilis Bishop & Crosby, 1935 – USA
