= Erigone autumnalis =

Scientific classification
- Kingdom: Animalia
- Phylum: Arthropoda
- Subphylum: Chelicerata
- Class: Arachnida
- Order: Araneae
- Infraorder: Araneomorphae
- Family: Linyphiidae
- Genus: Erigone
- Species: E. autumnalis

Binomial name
- Erigone autumnalis Emerton, 1882

Species of spider

Erigone autumnalis is a species of dwarf spiders in the family Linyphiidae. It is found in North and Central America, and it has been introduced to Azores, Europe, United Arab Emirates, and New Caledonia.
