= Erigone aletris =

Scientific classification
- Kingdom: Animalia
- Phylum: Arthropoda
- Subphylum: Chelicerata
- Class: Arachnida
- Order: Araneae
- Infraorder: Araneomorphae
- Family: Linyphiidae
- Genus: Erigone
- Species: E. aletris

Binomial name
- Erigone aletris Crosby & Bishop, 1928

Species of spider

Erigone aletris is a spider species found in the United States and Canada. It has been introduced to Britain and Italy.
