= Sisicus =

Scientific classification
- Kingdom: Animalia
- Phylum: Arthropoda
- Subphylum: Chelicerata
- Class: Arachnida
- Order: Araneae
- Infraorder: Araneomorphae
- Family: Linyphiidae
- Genus: Sisicus; Bishop & Crosby, 1938

Type species
- S. penifusifer Bishop & Crosby, 1938

Species
- S. apertus (Holm, 1939) – North America, Europe, Russia (Europe to Far East); S. penifusifer Bishop & Crosby, 1938 – USA, Canada; S. volutasilex Dupérré & Paquin, 2007 – Canada

Genus of spiders

Sisicus is a genus of sheet weavers that was first described by S. C. Bishop & C. R. Crosby in 1938. As of June 2019 it contains only three species, found in North America, Europe, Siberia, and East Asia: S. apertus, S. penifusifer, and S. volutasilex.
