= A Noiseless Patient Spider =

Poem by Walt Whitman

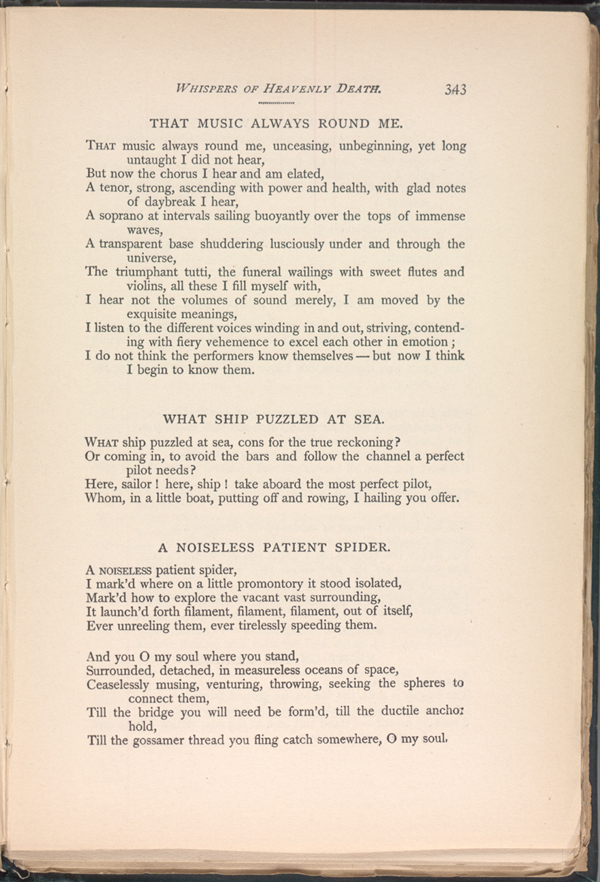
Page 343 of Walt Whitman's Leaves of Grass, containing "A Noiseless Patient Spider," published 1891.

"A Noiseless Patient Spider" is a short poem by Walt Whitman. It was originally part of his poem "Whispers of Heavenly Death", written expressly for The Broadway, A London Magazine, issue 10 (October 1868), numbered as stanza "3." It was retitled "A Noiseless Patient Spider" and reprinted as part of a larger cluster in Passage to India (1871). The poem was later published in Whitman's poetry collection Leaves of Grass. The poem has inspired other poets and musical compositions for its theme of the individual soul in relation to the world.

== Publications ==
=== Original publication ===
The first version of the poem, published in 1868, appears below. The later published versions do not differ substantially from this, except that the punctuation was greatly reduced.

A noiseless, patient spider,
I mark'd, where, on a little promontory; it stood, isolated;
Mark'd how, to explore the vacant, vast surrounding,
It launch'd forth filament, filament, filament, out of itself;
Ever unreeling them – ever tirelessly speeding them.

And you, O my soul, where you stand,
Surrounded, detached, in measureless oceans of space,
Ceaselessly musing, venturing, throwing, – seeking the spheres, to connect them;
Till the bridge you will need, be form'd – till the ductile anchor hold;
Till the gossamer thread you fling, catch somewhere, O my soul.

=== Other publications and drafts ===
The first drafted ideas for "A Noiseless Patient Spider" appear in a notebook held by Whitman in the mid 19th century. Whitman's musings in this passage flesh out one of the most critically discussed themes of the poem: the experience of the Self. The first version of the poem not in draft form was included as the third part of a poem collection called "Whispers of Heavenly Death," published in The Broadway. A London Magazine in 1868. This first publication did not specify "A Noiseless Patient Spider" as an independent poem. Its second appearance, in Whitman's Passage to India (1871), makes this distinction, evidenced by the use of "lower-case capitals" in printing the first word (of more than one letter), which was a publishing convention used in the 19th century to designate the beginning of a poem. The only other changes made between the first two publications are several line indentations, the numbering of the stanzas, and the removal of a comma after "noiseless." In 1891, the poem was published again in Leaves of Grass, with new indentation, eleven dropped commas, and the substitution of all dashes and semicolons for commas. The version published in Leaves of Grass is shown in the image above. This is the version most commonly published.

== Structure and theme ==
"A Noiseless Patient Spider" is in free verse. The poem is ten lines total, split into two stanzas of five lines. The poem deals with the theme of isolation, particularly the isolation of an individual soul in relation to the larger world. Whitman uses a central extended metaphor in which the spider in the poem represents the speaker's soul. Other literary devices employed include inverted syntax ("A noiseless, patient spider/I mark'd, where, on a little promontory; it stood") and repetition ("It launch'd forth filament, filament, filament").

== Influences ==
The Soul, or the Self, is a prominent theme in "A Noiseless Patient Spider." Wilton Eckley argues much of Whitman's poetry, including Whitman's spider-as-soul metaphor in "A Noiseless Patient Spider," was influenced by the poetry of Emerson. Whitman's poem in turn inspired other poets. The work of Iranian poet Parvin E'tesami suggests such an influence. Her poem "God's Weaver" features a spider protagonist and deals with the theme of isolation, which is prevalent in Whitman's "A Noiseless Patient Spider."

"A Noiseless Patient Spider" has inspired musical compositions. Ingolf Dahl, a German-American composer, set it for women's chorus with piano accompaniment in 1972. Composer and conductor Kenneth Fuchs composed "Whispers of Heavenly Death: String Quartet No. 3 After Poems by Walt Whitman." This instrumental interpretation was performed by the American String Quartet in Ann Arbor, Michigan on February 7, 1999.

== See also ==
- Ballooning (spider)
