= Ceratinopsis monticola =

Scientific classification
- Kingdom: Animalia
- Phylum: Arthropoda
- Subphylum: Chelicerata
- Class: Arachnida
- Order: Araneae
- Infraorder: Araneomorphae
- Family: Linyphiidae
- Genus: Ceratinopsis
- Species: C. monticola

Binomial name
- Ceratinopsis monticola (Simon, 1894)

Species of spider

Ceratinopsis monticola is a species of spider of the genus Ceratinopsis. It is endemic to Sri Lanka.
