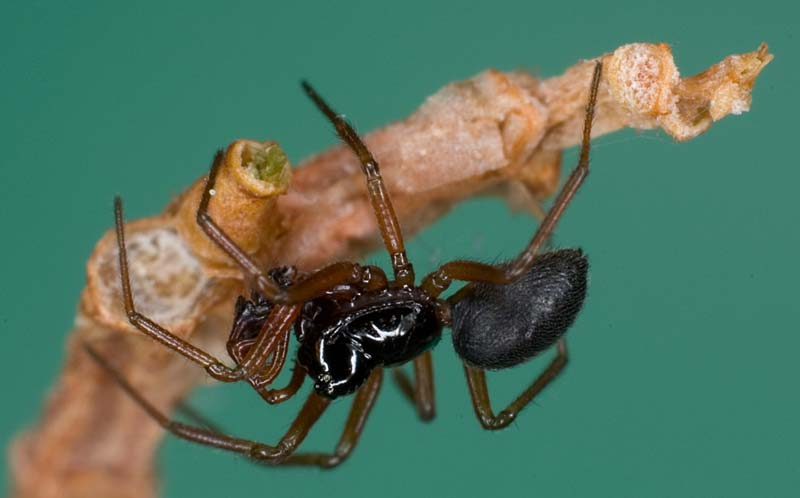

Scientific classification
- Kingdom: Animalia
- Phylum: Arthropoda
- Subphylum: Chelicerata
- Class: Arachnida
- Order: Araneae
- Infraorder: Araneomorphae
- Family: Linyphiidae
- Genus: Erigone
- Species: E. atra

Binomial name
- Erigone atra Blackwall, 1833

Synonyms
- Erigone atra Blackwall, 1833; Argus nigrimanus Walckenaer, 1841; Erigone vagabunda Westring, 1861; Neriene atra (Blackwall, 1833); Erigone persimilis O. Pickard-Cambridge, 1875; Erigone lantosquensis Simon, 1884; Erigone praepulchra Keyserling, 1886; Hillhousia desolans F. O. Pickard-Cambridge, 1894; Erigone hakusanensis Oi, 1964

= Erigone atra =

Species of spider

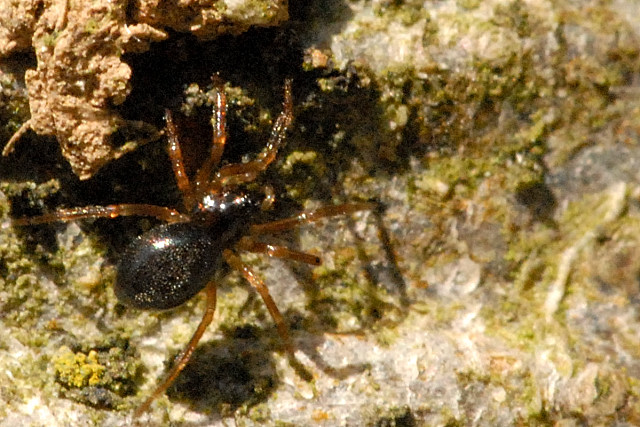
Erigone Atra

Erigone atra is a species of dwarf spider or money spider, in the family Linyphiidae. It is commonly found in North America, Europe, parts of Russia (European to Far East), Central Asia, China, Mongolia, Korea, and Japan. This spider is one of the most common Erigone spiders. E. atra is an important spider for agriculture, as it preys on pests such as aphids which are commonly found on crops. E. atra spiders are aeronautical spiders, as they travel via ballooning. This technique, sometimes referred to as kiting, allows E. atra spiders to traverse large distances and find new habitats when environmental or human stresses create unfit living environments. E. atra is difficult to differentiate from other congeneric species because of their similar sizes and coloring.

== Description ==
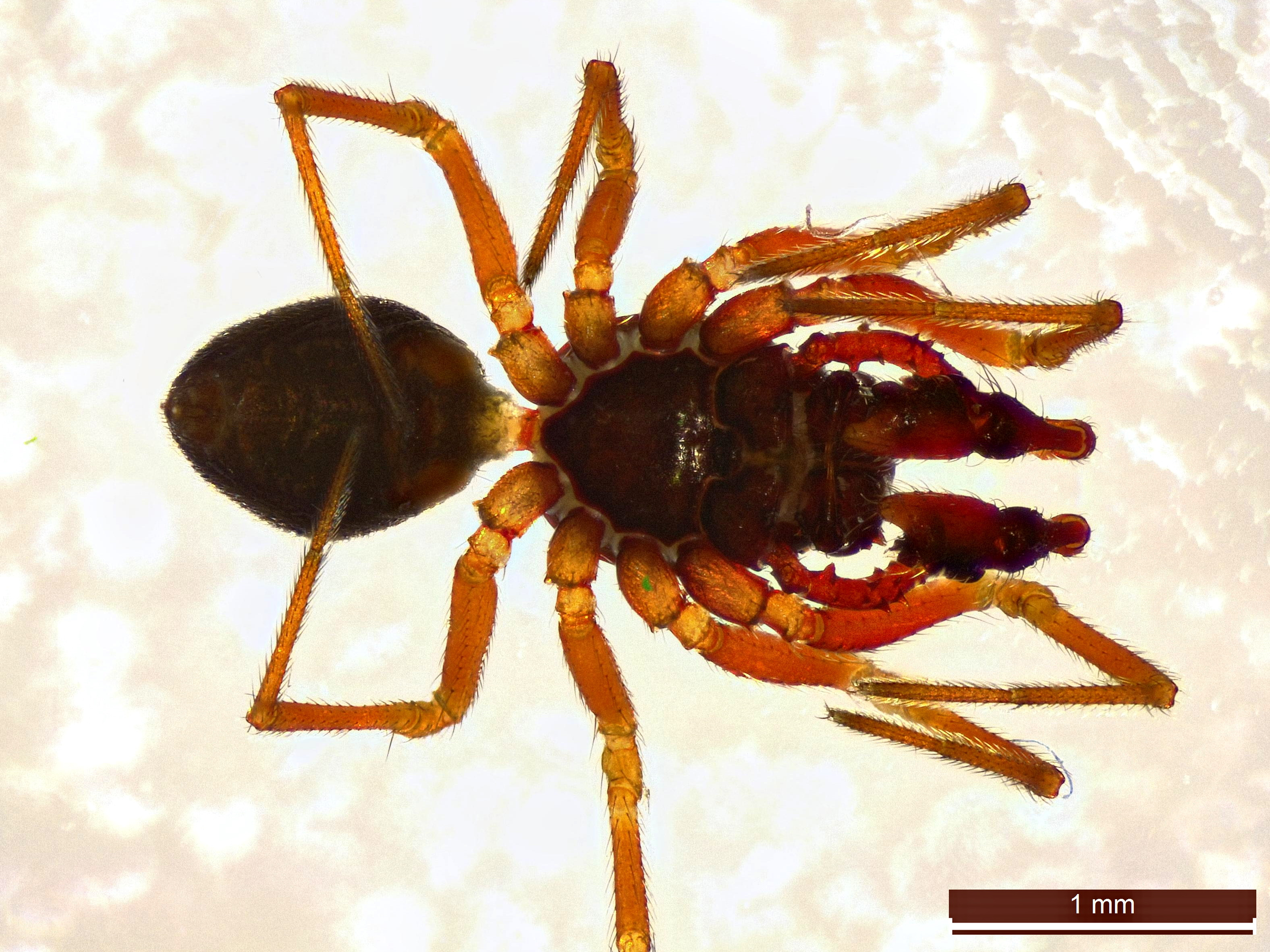
Preserved male Erigone atra

The female E. atra ranges from 1.8 to 2.8 mm in length. Their cephalothorax region is 0.8 to 1.0 mm in length, black or dark brown in color, and is hairless. The carapace of their cephalothorax have smaller teeth or no teeth compared to males. Their abdomens are larger than their cephalothorax regions ranging from 0.8 to 2.0 mm and are black. Their legs are all attached to the cephalothorax and are uniformly brown. Members of the Linyphiidae family are often identified by the spinal patterns on the tibia portion of their legs. E. atra and similar, congeneric species have a 2-2-2-1 tibial spinal pattern. E. atra are covered in hairs. The pedipalps of the females have no observable claw. Female E. atra look very similar to congeneric species Erigone arctica.

The male E. atra ranges from 1.9 to 2.5 mm in length. Their cephalothorax region is 1.0 to 1.2 mm in length, hairless, and black or brown. The carapace of their cephalothorax have marginal teeth along the sides. The head region of their carapace is slightly raised compared to females. Their abdomens are smaller and more pointed than female abdomens, ranging from 0.7 to 1.5 mm are black. Their legs are all attached to the cephalothorax and are uniformly brown and have a 2-2-2-1 tibial spinal pattern similar to females. Male pedipalps are longer than females, are covered in hair and tooth-like apophyses. Male E. atra look very similar to the congeneric species Erigone dentipalpis.

E. atra eyes are similar to other members of the Linyphiidae family. They have two rows of four eyes. The back row of eyes are straight while the front row is slightly curved. The front middle eyes are significantly smaller than the side eyes.

== Taxonomy ==
Erigone atra was first described by arachnologist John Blackwall in 1833. They belong to the Linyphiidae family, which are also known as sheet weaver spiders. The Erigoninae subfamily are known as dwarf spiders in the United States and money spiders in the United Kingdom. Erigone is one of the many genera in the Erigoninae subfamilies and was discovered by Jean Victor Audouin in 1826. As of October 2020 the genus contains 111 accepted species.

== Distribution and habitat ==
=== Geographic range ===
E. atra has a holarctic distribution, from North America to Japan. The spider is most abundant in Western Europe.

=== Habitat ===
E. atra spiders live in a variety of habitats. This is because of their ability to travel long distances via ballooning. They are primarily found in grasslands, fallows, and crop fields. E. atra's colonial habitat is subject to variation based on season and other environmental factors. They prefer grasslands with high yields of vegetation and fewer populations of different species. E. atra prefer perennial grasslands over crops because perennial habitats are sustained over time. During the winters, E. atra prefer higher vegetation habitats as they provide more protection from predators and increased insulation from the cold. The increased canopy cover creates a dry shelter with ground vegetation which is required for overwintering. Some exchange between grassland and crop habitat exists during a spider's lifetime. E. atra can be found in regions where both cows and sheep graze. Combined grazing of cows and sheep create a uniform expanse of short grass which provides an ideal high-density, low-species habitat.

== Diet ==
=== Prey selection ===
E. atra eat aphids, springtails, gnats and other crop pests. Their diet consists primarily of species of aphids and isotomidae springtails, as both families of pest are selected for by E. atra. Both insects are found in high density in crop fields, one of the primary habitats of E. atra. Aphids are caught more frequently by the spiders, however, springtails are typically consumed more because they are more easily identifiable by the spiders. E. atra selects prey based on size. Minor preferences for larger springtails were observed in E. atra females, and females ate a greater percentage of larger prey compared to smaller prey. Female E. atra have higher predation rates than males. Prey selection is dependent on the habitat the spiders are in. The variability in habitat due to the spider's large range from aeronautical travel leads to variability in prey selection.

=== Prey capture ===
E. atra capture prey both by web capture and by hunting. Small webs are sometimes built a few millimeters off the ground around crops or other feeding places for aphids, springtails, and other pests. These webs are used for prey capture by killing prey entangled in web threads. Webs are also built above bare soil and can be used as a base for actively attacking and killing prey rather than entangling prey. E. atra have also been observed searching for prey on plants and holding prey within their chelicerae without webs nearby. Adult males almost exclusively hunt without a web.

== Behavior ==
=== Ballooning ===
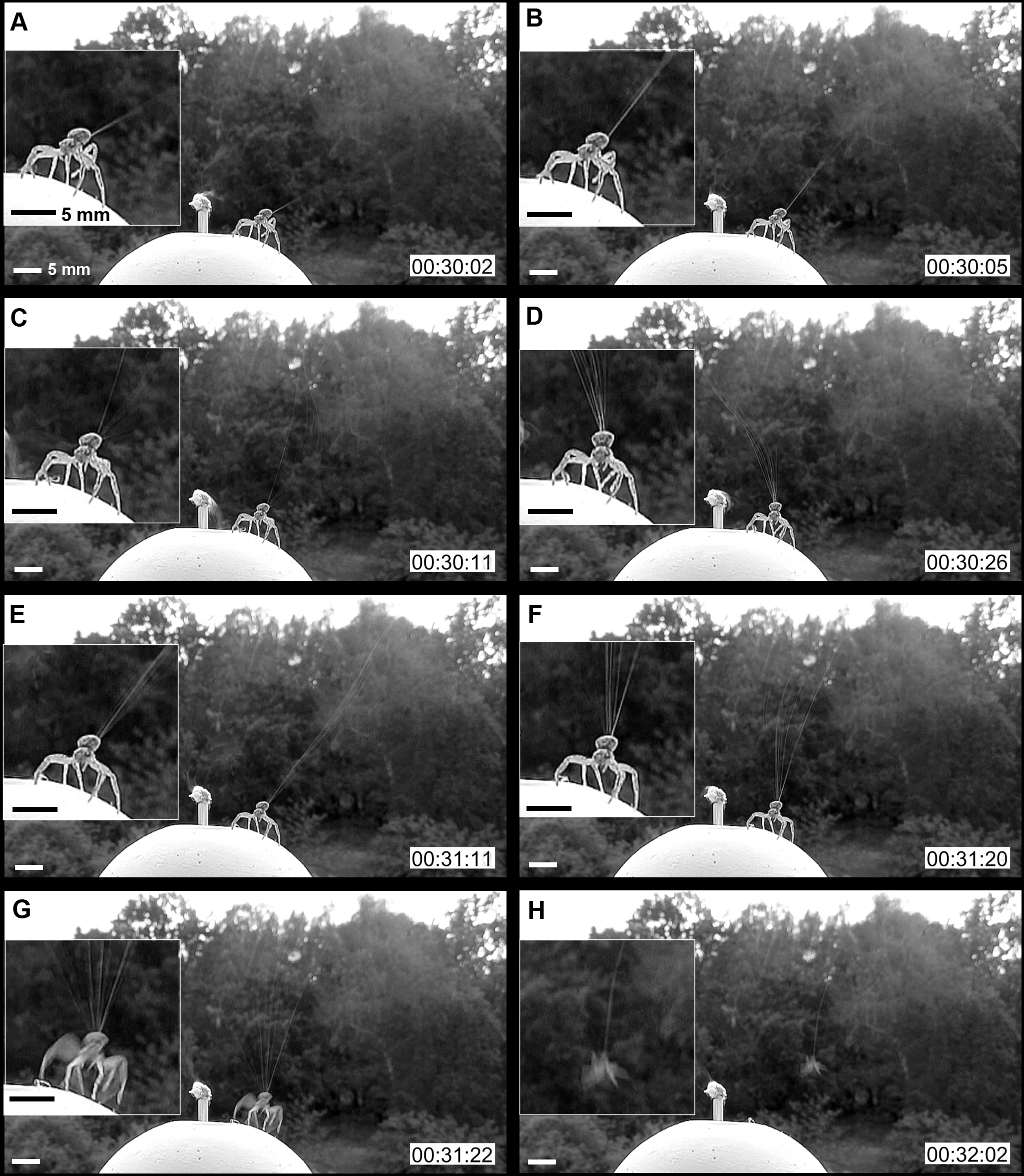
Spider tip-toe and ballooning behavior

Ballooning is the behavioral trait where aeronautical insects shoot web threads into the air and cause them to become airborne. In E. atra, ballooning is a form of aerial dispersal in which the spiders use thin threads of spider silk, often called gossamers, to catch electric field currents and air currents. E. atra first undergoes a behavior called tip-toeing to become airborne. A spider will climb up to an elevated position, to avoid threads coming into contact with the ground or other objects, and raise its abdomen in the air. This position maximizes silk released from the spinnerets and this initial silk release occurs via muscular release. The silk strands are pulled by drag, which both further pulls out released gossamers from the spinnerets while also pulling the spider into the air. Static electricity fields may also contribute to lift along with drag from the air currents.

Wind turbulence is a major cue for spiders to begin tip-toe behavior. Food deprivation is another cue for spiders to disperse. Acute feeding stress, feeding history and age all influence how food deprivation influences tip-toe behavior. Temperature increases are another cue for E. atra dispersal behavior. In late summer, there is a mass ballooning dispersal triggered by high temperatures. However, the spiders' propensity of ballooning (long-distance dispersal) was the lowest at 30 °C. VarCelsiusin E. atra ballooning behavior is due to developmental variations. The habitat chosen by the mother can affect ballooning behavior in offspring because of temperature, food availability, and other environmental circumstances during rearing of young.

=== Rappelling ===
In addition to ballooning, there is also a second kind of dispersal, and that is the short-distance dispersal: rappelling. These spiders tend to disperse by utilizing silk as either a sail, which means that ballooning is being used, or rappelling. This means that this technique is being used to bridge the threads. There is a higher risk of mortality and cost associated with ballooning than rappelling, which is why spiders tend to select for the more controlled behavior or rappelling.

== Reproduction and lifespan ==
=== Lifespan ===
Two generation of E. atra are observed per year. The first generation is laid by females which have overwintered as adults. These eggs hatch and mature in early summer and copulation takes place. Later in summer, the second generation of egg sacs arise. The second generation of E. atra hatch and mature in early fall. Some females are fertilized before winter but store sperm while overwintering and produce egg sacs in the spring. In comparing the two sexes' lifespan, the females live on average 18 days longer than the males.

=== Reproduction ===
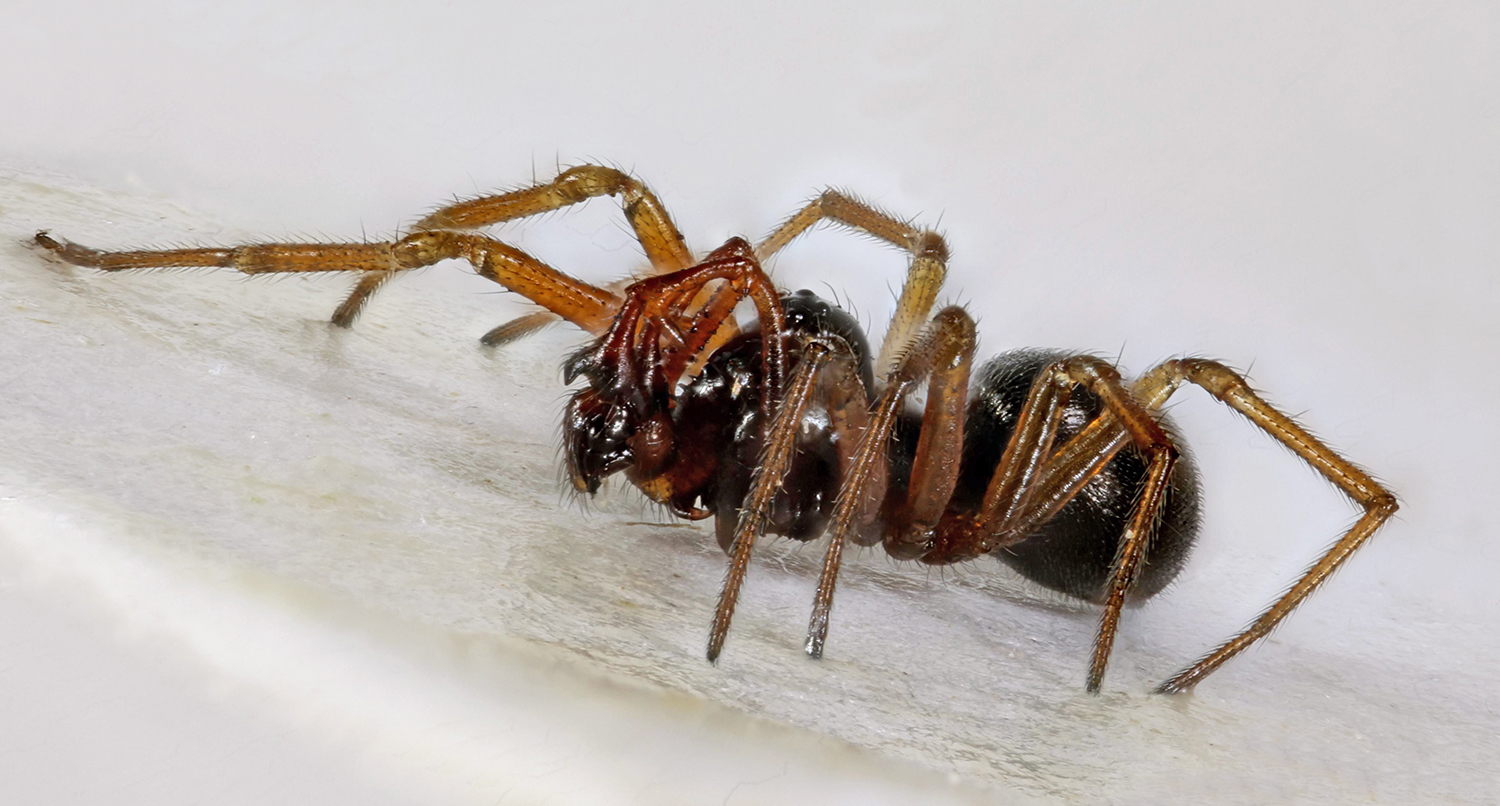
Erigone atra

Female E. atra create egg sacs, which are sometimes referred to as a cocoon, to hold their eggs. A female will create egg sacs their whole adult life and they will typically die less than 10 days after they have made their last egg sac. Females will lay on average 4.4-11.8 eggs a day at optimal temperature, and clutch size is on average 12-14 eggs. Also, in comparison to temperature groups 15, 20, 25, and 30 degrees Celsius, the groups reared in 20 and 25 degrees Celsius had the highest level of fecundity. Hence, temperature does impact the amount of eggs in the first sac as well as the overall number of eggs produced in the lifetime.

E. atra typically have smaller clutches but produce egg sacs at a rapid rate. As females age, the number of eggs per egg sac decreases. Egg sacs are often produced near the female's web. Increased prey availability corresponds with increased reproductive ability. Depending on prey availability, females will kill more prey than can be consumed because as prey availability increases, so does the amount of prey eaten per egg produced.

=== Development ===
E. atra development is dependent on temperature and prey abundance. E. atra develop very quickly in warm weather. In a laboratory study by De Keer et al. they were observed to reach adulthood in 20 days when they were reared at 20 °C. When spiders where reared at 10 °C development lasted on average 150 days and when reared at 5 °C spiders only moulted once. Juvenile mortality increases as temperature decreases. Prey abundance has a major effect on the duration of development. As availability of prey decreased, length of spider development increased and mortality rate of spiderlings increased. Development usually takes place during warm periods in early summer and fall, allowing for rapid development. Rapid development is needed because of population loss due to dispersal, egg sac parasites, and human agricultural practices.

=== Egg sac parasites ===
Gelis festinans is a small insect specialized parasitoid that specifically targets E. atra egg sacs. They are wingless, on average 3 millimeters long, and found in open, grassy habitats. A female's parasitoid will deposit one or several eggs into an E. atra egg sac wall. A larva will hatch that eats the spider eggs and after on average two week, a single adult parasitoid emerges from the egg sac. G. festinans are attracted to plant odors from E. atra habitats, such as wheat or grass odors. G. festinans habitat preference is dependent on E. atra availability and population density. Female G. festinans spend a significantly more time on E. atra webbing zones rather than non-webbing zones. Once a G. festinans has encountered webbing they change from a random search pattern to a restricted search pattern for female E. atra. This change in search behavior could be cued by either chemicals in the webbing, E. atra pheromones, or because of the webbing structure. G. festinans can mark search areas. Marked regions are searched less by other females. Female G. festinans are also able to distinguish between parasitized and unparasitized egg sacs. No superparasitism has been observed in G. festinans.

== Webs ==
As members of the Linyphiidae family, E. atra are sheet-weaving spiders. The webs are small webs typically anchored onto vegetation and are composed of a mesh sheet of silk threads. There is usually no order or pattern in creating webs unlike orb-weaver spiders. E. atra usually build their webs over depressions in the ground or over bare soil. In a study done by Alderweireldt et al. analyzing prey selection and capture techniques the median web size of E. atra was found to be 7.6 cm^{2} in crop fields. When taking into account individual variation, the 7.6 cm^{2} is in agreement with the average web size of 4 cm^{2} found for the Erigoninae family. E. atra webs can be used to entangle prey but are not vital for prey capture or feeding. Webs can also be used as a base from which E. atra can actively attack and kill prey nearby.
