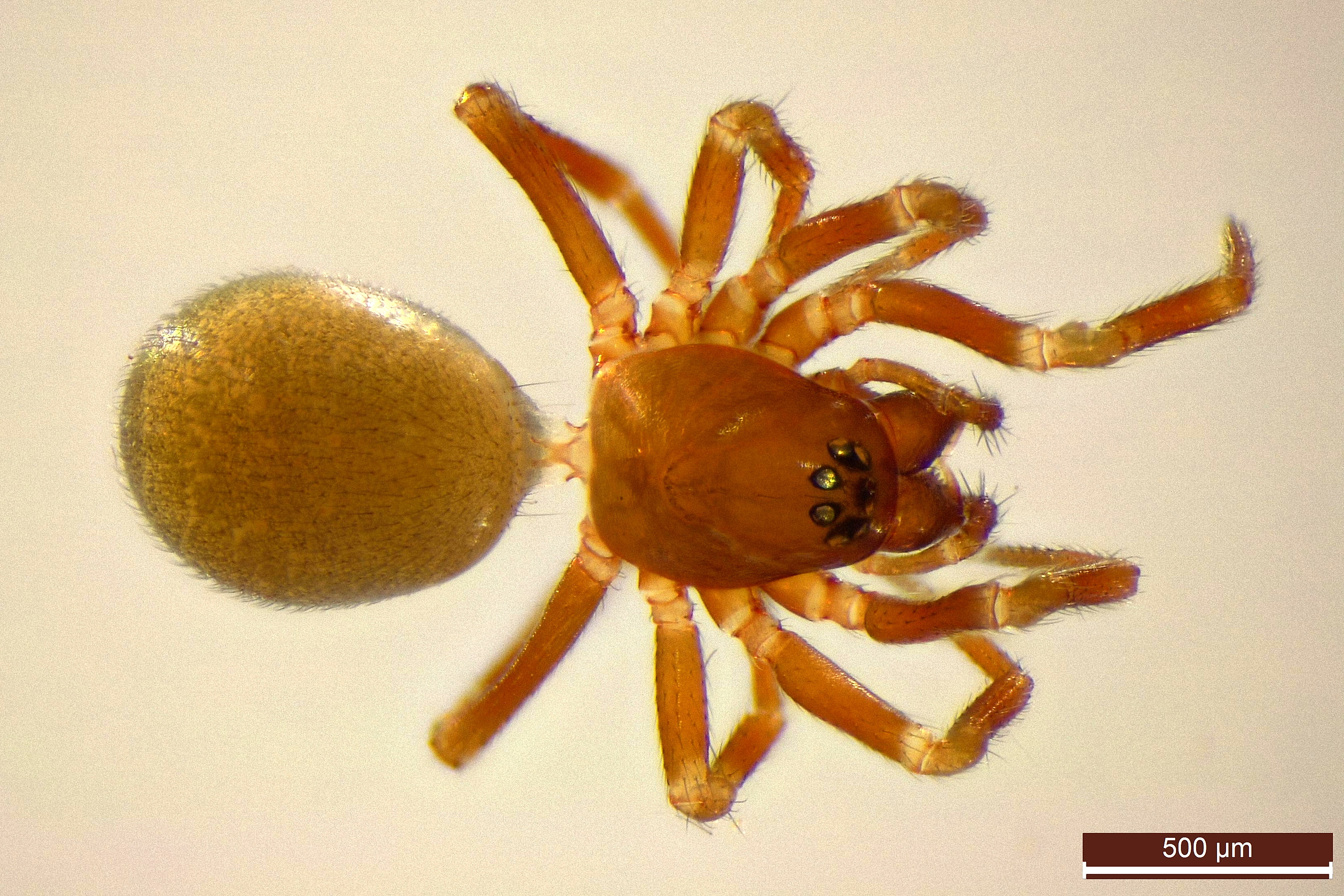
- T. pallens, female

Scientific classification
- Kingdom: Animalia
- Phylum: Arthropoda
- Subphylum: Chelicerata
- Class: Arachnida
- Order: Araneae
- Infraorder: Araneomorphae
- Family: Linyphiidae
- Genus: Tapinocyba; Simon, 1884

Type species
- T. praecox (O. Pickard-Cambridge, 1873)

Species
- 40, see text

Synonyms
- Colobocyba Simon, 1926

= Tapinocyba =

Genus of spiders

Tapinocyba is a genus of sheet weavers that was first described by Eugène Louis Simon in 1884.

== Species ==
As of August 2021 it contains forty species and two subspecies, found in Europe, Asia, Canada, the United States, and Algeria:

- Tapinocyba abetoneensis Wunderlich, 1980 – Italy
- Tapinocyba affinis Lessert, 1907 – Europe
  - Tapinocyba a. orientalis Millidge, 1979 – Central Europe
  - Tapinocyba a. pyrenaea Millidge, 1979 – Spain, France
- Tapinocyba algirica Bosmans, 2007 – Portugal, Algeria
- Tapinocyba altimontana Tanasevitch, 2019 – Nepal
- Tapinocyba anceps Denis, 1948 – France
- Tapinocyba bicarinata (Emerton, 1913) – USA
- Tapinocyba biscissa (O. Pickard-Cambridge, 1873) – Europe
- Tapinocyba cameroni Dupérré & Paquin, 2007 – Canada
- Tapinocyba corsica (Simon, 1884) – France (Corsica)
- Tapinocyba dietrichi Crosby & Bishop, 1933 – USA
- Tapinocyba discedens Denis, 1948 – France
- Tapinocyba distincta (Banks, 1892) – USA
- Tapinocyba emei Tanasevitch, 2018 – China
- Tapinocyba emertoni Barrows & Ivie, 1942 – USA
- Tapinocyba formosa Tanasevitch, 2011 – Taiwan
- Tapinocyba gamma Chamberlin, 1949 – USA
- Tapinocyba hortensis (Emerton, 1924) – USA
- Tapinocyba insecta (L. Koch, 1869) – Europe
- Tapinocyba kolymensis Eskov, 1989 – Russia, China
- Tapinocyba latia Millidge, 1979 – Italy
- Tapinocyba ligurica Thaler, 1976 – Italy, France
- Tapinocyba lindrothi Hackman, 1954 – Canada
- Tapinocyba lucana Millidge, 1979 – Italy
- Tapinocyba maureri Thaler, 1991 – Switzerland, Italy
- Tapinocyba minuta (Emerton, 1909) – USA, Canada
- Tapinocyba mitis (O. Pickard-Cambridge, 1882) – Europe
- Tapinocyba montivaga Tanasevitch, 2019 – Nepal
- Tapinocyba pallens (O. Pickard-Cambridge, 1873) – Europe to Armenia
- Tapinocyba parva Seo, 2018 – Korea
- Tapinocyba pontis Chamberlin, 1949 – USA
- Tapinocyba praecox (O. Pickard-Cambridge, 1873) (type) – Europe
- Tapinocyba prima Dupérré & Paquin, 2005 – USA, Canada
- Tapinocyba silvicultrix Saito, 1980 – Japan
- Tapinocyba simplex (Emerton, 1882) – USA
- Tapinocyba spoliatrix Tanasevitch, 1985 – Kyrgyzstan
- Tapinocyba subula Seo, 2018 – Korea
- Tapinocyba sucra Chamberlin, 1949 – USA
- Tapinocyba suganamii Saito & Ono, 2001 – Japan
- Tapinocyba ventosa Millidge, 1979 – France
- Tapinocyba vermontis Chamberlin, 1949 – USA
