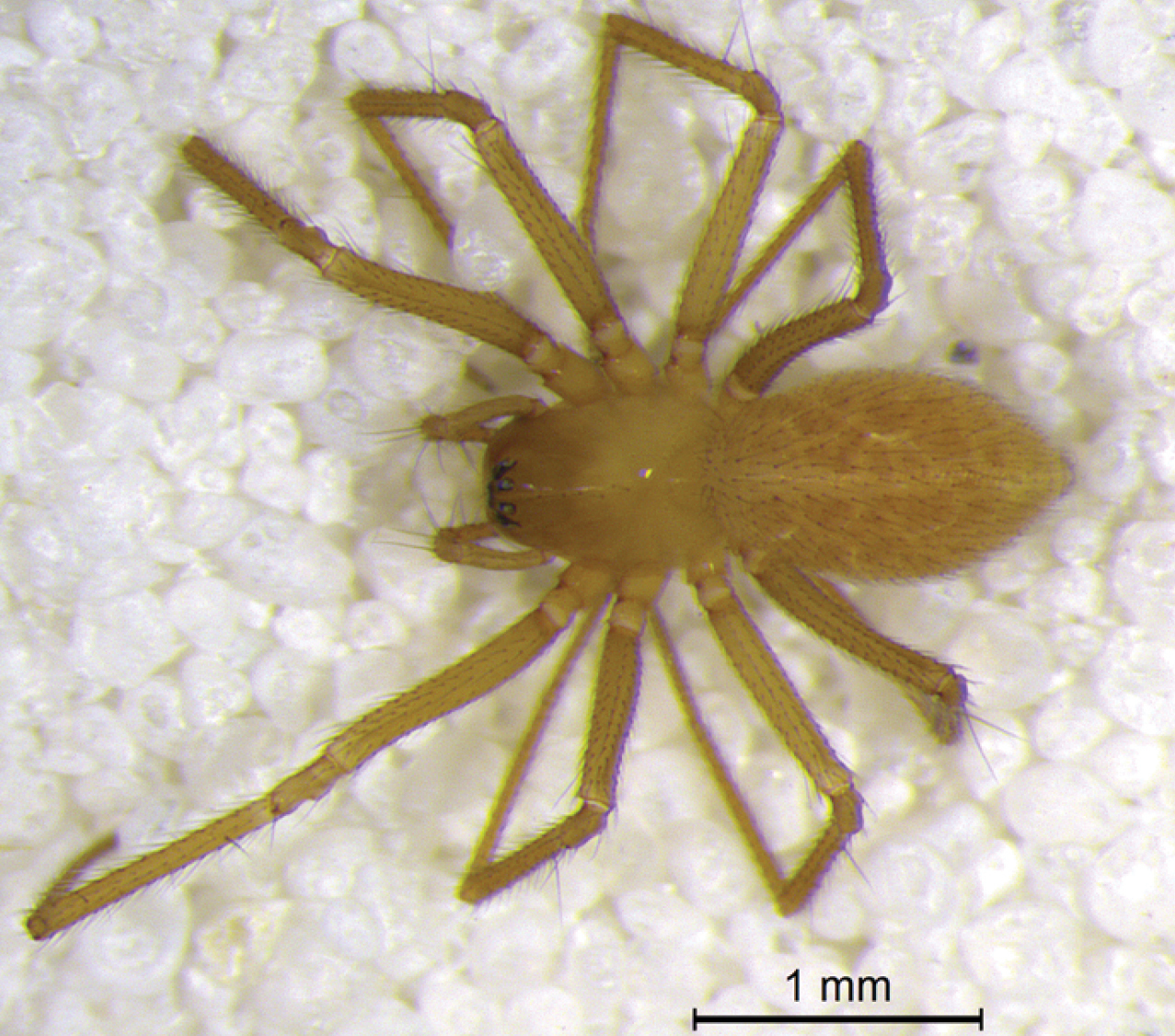
- Islandiana lewisi

Scientific classification
- Kingdom: Animalia
- Phylum: Arthropoda
- Subphylum: Chelicerata
- Class: Arachnida
- Order: Araneae
- Infraorder: Araneomorphae
- Family: Linyphiidae
- Genus: Islandiana; Braendegaard, 1932

Type species
- I. falsifica (Keyserling, 1886)

Species
- 15, see text

Synonyms
- Aduva Bishop & Crosby, 1936

= Islandiana =

Genus of spiders

Islandiana is a genus of dwarf spiders that was first described by J. Braendegaard in 1932.

== Species ==
As of May 2019 it contains fifteen species, found in Canada, Greenland, Iceland, Russia, and the United States:

- Islandiana cavealis Ivie, 1965 – USA
- Islandiana coconino Ivie, 1965 – USA
- Islandiana cristata Eskov, 1987 – Russia (Europe to Far East), USA (Alaska), Canada
- Islandiana falsifica (Keyserling, 1886) (type) – North America, Northern Europe, Russia (Europe to Far East)
- Islandiana flaveola (Banks, 1892) – USA, Canada
- Islandiana flavoides Ivie, 1965 – USA
- Islandiana holmi Ivie, 1965 – USA
- Islandiana lasalana (Chamberlin & Ivie, 1935) – USA
- Islandiana lewisi Milne & Wells, 2018 – USA
- Islandiana longisetosa (Emerton, 1882) – USA, Canada
- Islandiana mimbres Ivie, 1965 – USA
- Islandiana muma Ivie, 1965 – USA
- Islandiana princeps Braendegaard, 1932 – USA, Canada, Greenland, Iceland
- Islandiana speophila Ivie, 1965 – USA
- Islandiana unicornis Ivie, 1965 – USA
