= Praestigia =

Scientific classification
- Kingdom: Animalia
- Phylum: Arthropoda
- Subphylum: Chelicerata
- Class: Arachnida
- Order: Araneae
- Infraorder: Araneomorphae
- Family: Linyphiidae
- Genus: Praestigia; Millidge, 1954

Type species
- P. duffeyi Millidge, 1954

Species
- 8, see text

Genus of spiders

Praestigia is a genus of sheet weavers that was first described by Alfred Frank Millidge in 1954.

The defining characteristic of Praestigia is a projection issuing from the ocular region in males, which varies in form depending on the species, and bears a cap at its distal end. The cap is composed of a series of interconnected fibers glued to the projection with a waxy substance. The cap itself is easily dislodged and lost, and where it originates from is unclear.

The generic name is a combination of Latin prae, meaning "in front" or "before" and Greek stigios, meaning "an awl," a reference to the above-described projection.

== Species ==
As of May 2019 it contains eight species:

- Praestigia duffeyi Millidge, 1954 (type) – Europe
- Praestigia eskovi Marusik, Gnelitsa & Koponen, 2008 – Russia
- Praestigia groenlandica Holm, 1967 – Canada, Greenland
- Praestigia kulczynskii Eskov, 1979 – Russia, Japan, Canada
- Praestigia makarovae Marusik, Gnelitsa & Koponen, 2008 – Russia
- Praestigia pini (Holm, 1950) – Sweden, Finland, Russia, Mongolia
- Praestigia sibirica Marusik, Gnelitsa & Koponen, 2008 – Russia, USA (Alaska)
- Praestigia uralensis Marusik, Gnelitsa & Koponen, 2008 – Russia
