= Coreorgonal =

Scientific classification
- Kingdom: Animalia
- Phylum: Arthropoda
- Subphylum: Chelicerata
- Class: Arachnida
- Order: Araneae
- Infraorder: Araneomorphae
- Family: Linyphiidae
- Genus: Coreorgonal; Bishop & Crosby, 1935

Type species
- C. bicornis (Emerton, 1923)

Species
- C. bicornis (Emerton, 1923) – USA, Canada; C. monoceros (Keyserling, 1884) – USA; C. petulcus (Millidge, 1981) – USA

Genus of spiders

Coreorgonal is a genus of North American dwarf spiders that was first described by S. C. Bishop & C. R. Crosby in 1935. As of May 2019 it contains only three species in the United States and Canada: C. bicornis, C. monoceros, and C. petulcus.
