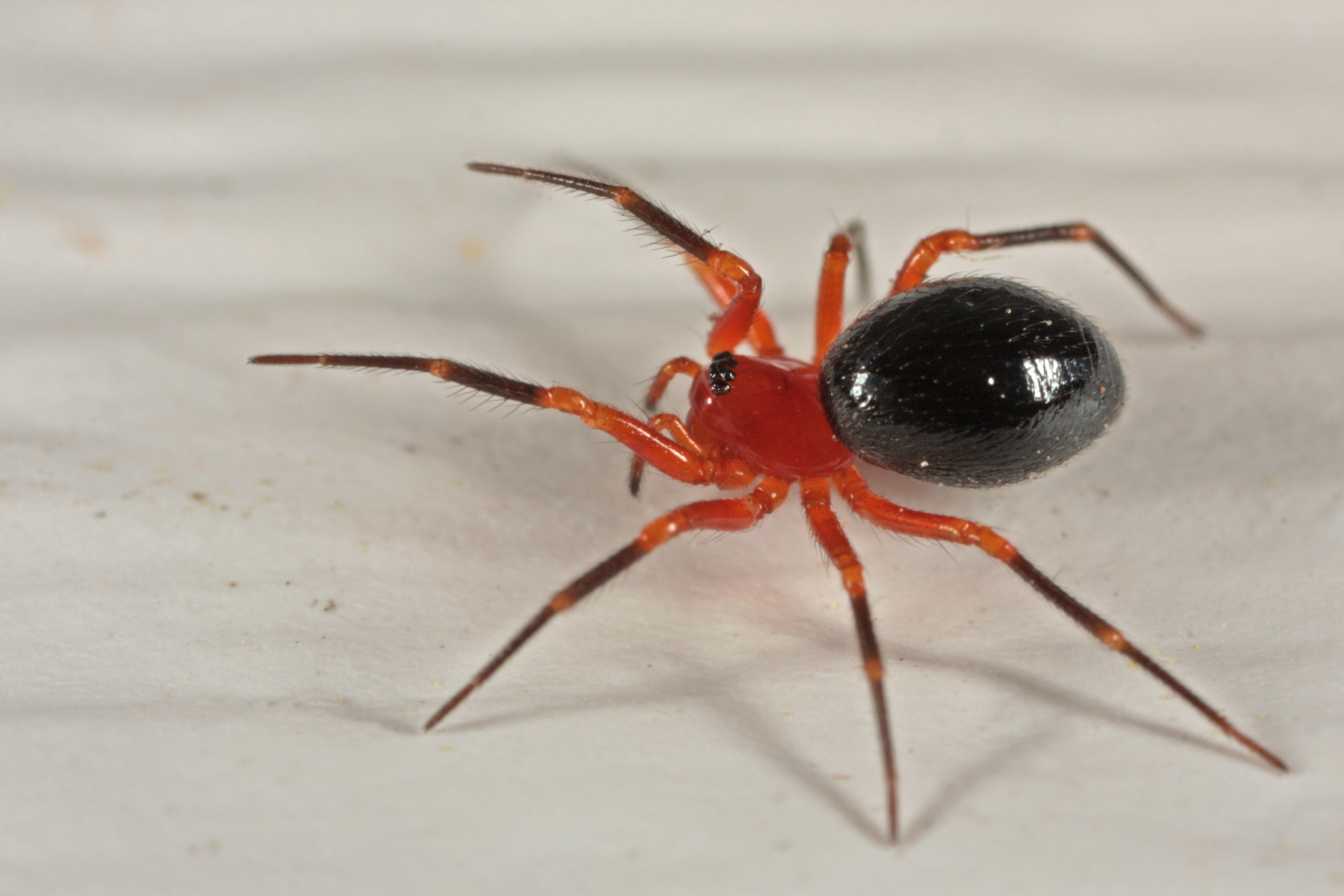
- H. florens

Scientific classification
- Kingdom: Animalia
- Phylum: Arthropoda
- Subphylum: Chelicerata
- Class: Arachnida
- Order: Araneae
- Infraorder: Araneomorphae
- Family: Linyphiidae
- Genus: Hypselistes; Simon, 1894

Type species
- H. florens (O. Pickard-Cambridge, 1875)

Species
- 9, see text

= Hypselistes =

Genus of spiders

Hypselistes is a genus of dwarf spiders that was first described by Eugène Louis Simon in 1894.

== Species ==
As of May 2019 it contains nine species and one subspecies, found in Canada, China, Japan, Kazakhstan, Mongolia, Russia, and the United States:

- Hypselistes acutidens Gao, Sha & Zhu, 1989 – China
- Hypselistes asiaticus Bösenberg & Strand, 1906 – Japan
- Hypselistes australis Saito & Ono, 2001 – Russia (Far East), Japan
- Hypselistes basarukini Marusik & Leech, 1993 – Russia (Sakhalin)
- Hypselistes florens (O. Pickard-Cambridge, 1875) (type) – USA, Canada
  - Hypselistes f. bulbiceps Chamberlin & Ivie, 1935 – USA
- Hypselistes fossilobus Fei & Zhu, 1993 – Russia (Far East), China
- Hypselistes jacksoni (O. Pickard-Cambridge, 1903) – Europe, Russia (Europe to Far East), Kazakhstan, Mongolia, China
- Hypselistes kolymensis Marusik & Leech, 1993 – Russia (Middle Siberia to Far North-East)
- Hypselistes semiflavus (L. Koch, 1879) – Russia (Europe to Far East), Japan
