= Atypena =

Scientific classification
- Kingdom: Animalia
- Phylum: Arthropoda
- Subphylum: Chelicerata
- Class: Arachnida
- Order: Araneae
- Infraorder: Araneomorphae
- Family: Linyphiidae
- Subfamily: Erigoninae
- Genus: Atypena; Simon, 1894

Type species
- A. superciliosa Simon, 1894

Species
- 8, see text

Synonyms
- Millplophrys Platnick, 1998; Paranasoona Heimer, 1984

Genus of spiders

Atypena is a genus of Asian dwarf spiders that was first described by Eugène Louis Simon in 1894.

== Species ==
As of May 2019 it contains eight species:

- Atypena adelinae Barrion & Litsinger, 1995 – Philippines
- Atypena cirrifrons (Heimer, 1984) – India, China, Laos, Thailand, Vietnam
- Atypena cracatoa (Millidge, 1995) – Indonesia (Krakatau)
- Atypena ellioti Jocqué, 1983 – Sri Lanka
- Atypena pallida (Millidge, 1995) – Thailand
- Atypena simoni Jocqué, 1983 – Sri Lanka
- Atypena superciliosa Simon, 1894 (type) – Philippines
- Atypena thailandica Barrion & Litsinger, 1995 – Thailand
