= Collinsia (spider) =

Scientific classification
- Kingdom: Animalia
- Phylum: Arthropoda
- Subphylum: Chelicerata
- Class: Arachnida
- Order: Araneae
- Infraorder: Araneomorphae
- Family: Linyphiidae
- Genus: Collinsia; O. Pickard-Cambridge, 1913

Type species
- C. distincta (Simon, 1884)

Species
- 23, see text

Synonyms
- Anitsia Chamberlin, 1922; Catabrithorax Chamberlin, 1920; Coryphaeolana Strand, 1914; Microerigone M. Dahl, 1928; Milleriana Denis, 1966

Genus of spiders

Collinsia is a genus of dwarf spiders that was first described by Octavius Pickard-Cambridge in 1913.

== Species ==
As of January 2026, this genus includes 23 species and one subspecies:

- Collinsia borea (L. Koch, 1879) – Russia (Novaya Zemlya, Middle Siberia to Far North-East), Alaska
- Collinsia caliginosa (L. Koch, 1879) – Russia (Europe to Far East), Central Asia, Alaska
  - C. c. nemenziana Thaler, 1980 – Austria
- Collinsia dentata Eskov, 1990 – Russia (West Siberia to Far East), Canada
- Collinsia denticulata Irfan, Zhang & Peng, 2022 – China
- Collinsia despaxi (Denis, 1950) – Spain, France
- Collinsia distincta (Simon, 1884) – Europe, Russia (Europe to South Siberia)
- Collinsia ezoensis (Saito, 1986) – Japan
- Collinsia hibernica (Simon, 1926) – France
- Collinsia holmgreni (Thorell, 1871) – Alaska, Canada, Greenland, Northern Europe, Russia (Europe to Far East), China
- Collinsia holmi Eskov, 1990 – Russia (north-eastern Siberia, Far North-East)
- Collinsia inerrans (O. Pickard-Cambridge, 1885) – Europe, Caucasus, Russia (Europe to Far East), Iran, Central Asia, China, Korea, Japan
- Collinsia ksenia (Crosby & Bishop, 1928) – Alaska, Canada, United States
- Collinsia oatimpa (Chamberlin, 1949) – United States
- Collinsia oxypaederotipus (Crosby, 1905) – Canada, United States
- Collinsia palmeni Hackman, 1954 – Canada
- Collinsia perplexa (Keyserling, 1886) – Canada, United States
- Collinsia pertinens (O. Pickard-Cambridge, 1875) – Canada, United States
- Collinsia plumosa (Emerton, 1882) – Canada, United States
- Collinsia probata (O. Pickard-Cambridge, 1874) – United States
- Collinsia sachalinensis Eskov, 1990 – Russia (Sakhalin, Kurile Is.), Japan
- Collinsia spetsbergensis (Thorell, 1871) – Alaska, Canada, Greenland, Northern Europe, Russia (Europe to Far East)
- Collinsia thulensis (Jackson, 1934) – Alaska, Canada, Greenland, Spitsbergen, Russia (Far North-East)
- Collinsia tianschanica Tanasevitch, 1989 – Kyrgyzstan
