= Ballooning (spider) =

Air-borne movement of spiders and other invertebrates

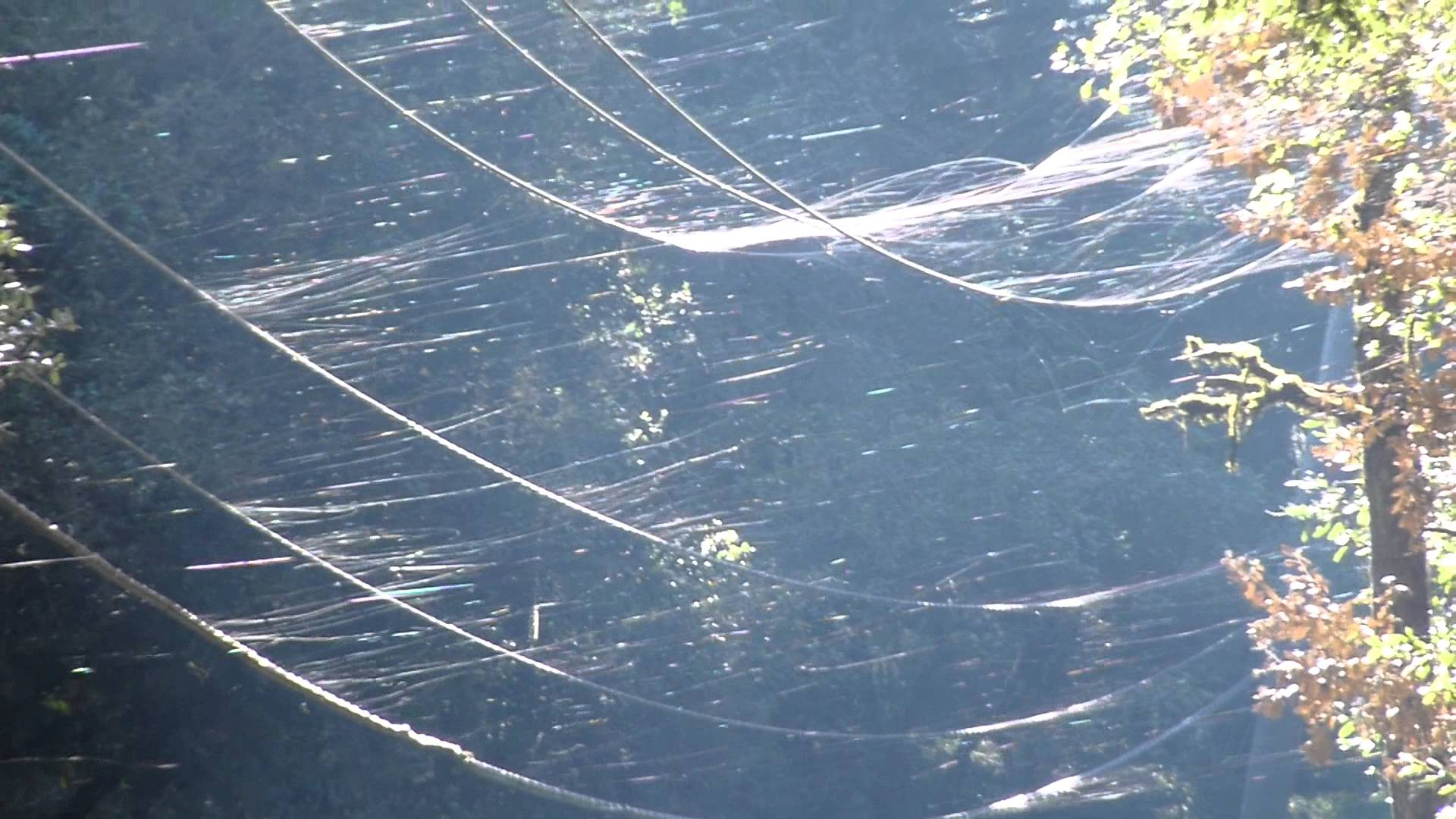
Spiderlings ballooning in the Santa Cruz Mountains of the San Francisco Peninsula

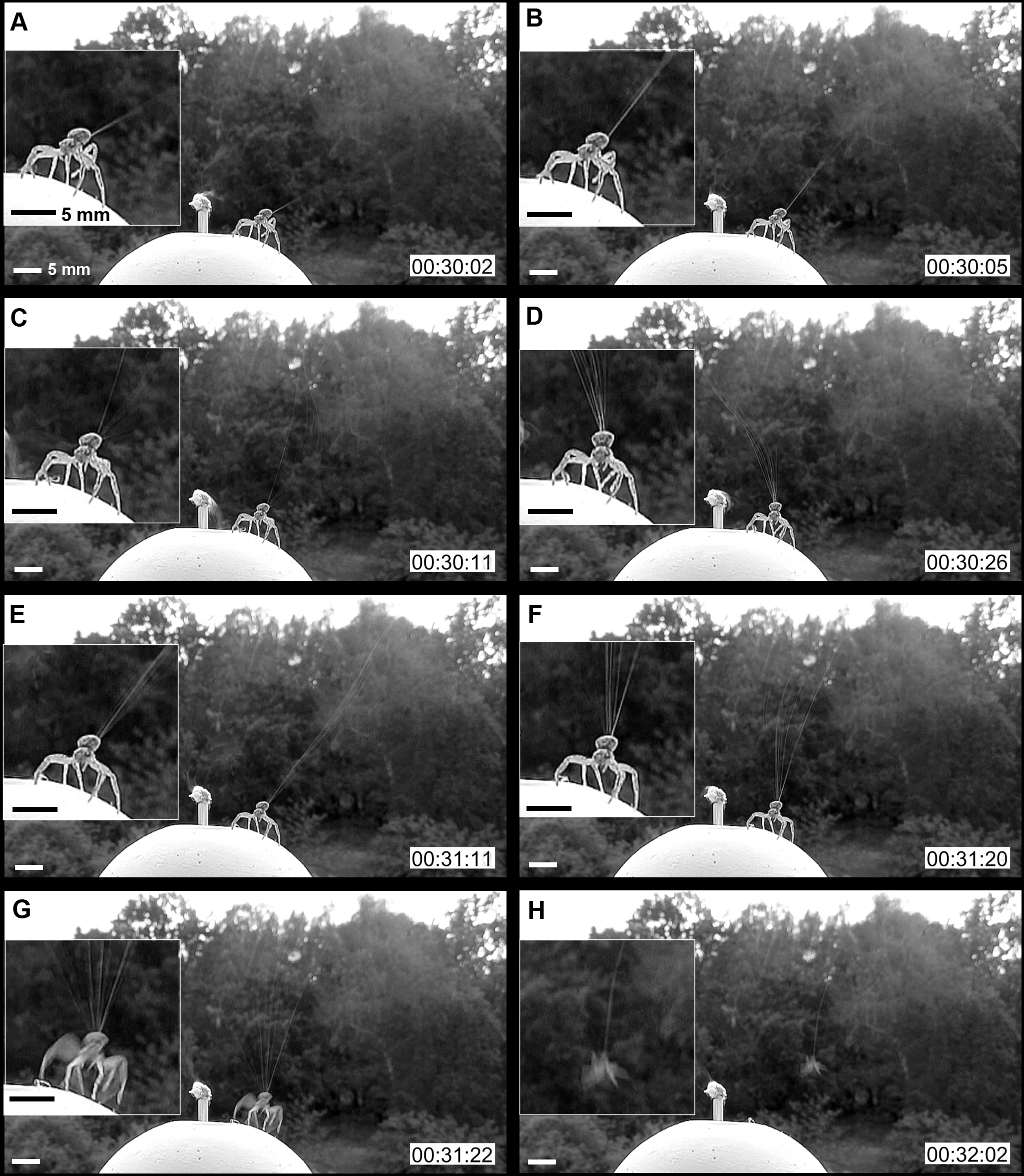
Image from an observational study of ballooning in large spiders depicting stages of ballooning take off

Ballooning, sometimes called kiting, is a process by which spiders, and some other small invertebrates, move through the air by releasing one or more gossamer threads to catch the wind, causing them to become airborne at the mercy of air currents and electric fields. A 2018 study concluded that electric fields provide enough force to lift spiders in the air, and possibly elicit ballooning behavior. This is primarily used by spiderlings to disperse; however, larger individuals have been observed doing so as well. The spider climbs to a high point and takes a stance with its abdomen to the sky, releasing fine silk threads from its spinneret until it becomes aloft. Journeys achieved vary from a few metres to hundreds of kilometres. Even atmospheric samples collected from balloons at five kilometres altitude and ships mid-ocean have reported spider landings. Ballooning can be dangerous due to predators and the unpredictable nature of long-distance ballooning, which may bring individuals to an unfavorable environment.

Ballooning is observed in many species of spiders, such as Erigone atra, Cyclosa turbinata, as well as in spider mites (Tetranychidae) and in larvae of 31 species of lepidoptera, distributed in 8 suborders. Bell and his colleagues put forward the hypothesis that ballooning first appeared in the Cretaceous. A 5-year-long research study in the 1920s–1930s revealed that 1 in every 17 invertebrates caught mid-air is a spider. Out of 28,739 specimens, 1,401 turned out to be spiders.

== Description ==
Xysticus audax tiptoeing, in preparation for ballooning

Ballooning is a behavior in which spiders and some other invertebrates use airborne dispersal to move between locations. A spider (usually limited to individuals of a small species), or spiderling after hatching, will climb as high as it can, stand on raised legs with its abdomen pointed upward ("tiptoeing"), and then release several silk threads from its spinnerets into the air. These automatically form a triangular shaped parachute which carries the spider away on updrafts of winds where even the slightest of breezes will disperse the arachnid. The Earth's static electric field may also provide lift in windless conditions. Ballooning behavior may be triggered by favorable electric fields.

Many spiders use especially fine silk called gossamer to lift themselves off a surface, and silk also may be used by a windblown spider to anchor itself to stop its journey. The term "gossamer" is used metaphorically for any exceedingly fine thread or fabric. Biologists also apply the term "balloon silk" to the threads that mechanically lift and drag systems.

It is generally thought that most spiders heavier than 1 mg are unlikely to use ballooning. Because many individuals die during ballooning, adults are less likely to balloon than spiderlings. However, adult females of several social Stegodyphus species (S. dumicola and S. mimosarum) weighing more than 100 mg and with a body size of up to 14 millimeters (0.55 in) have been observed ballooning using rising thermals on hot days without wind. These spiders use tens to hundreds of silk strands, which form a triangular sheet with a length and width of about 1 meter (39 in).

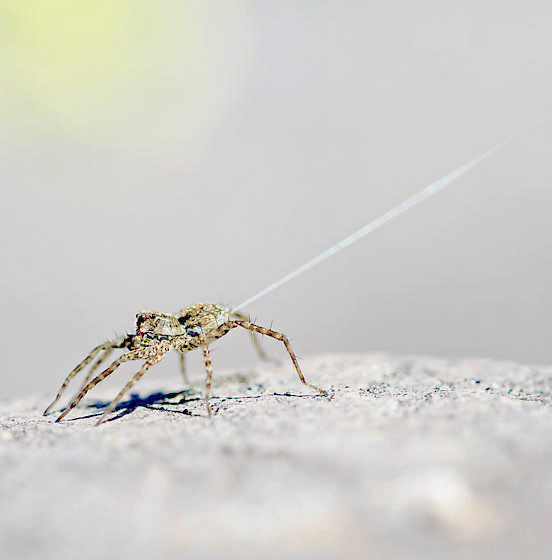
Pardosa spp. attempting to balloon

In Australia, in 2012 and in May 2015, millions of spiders were reported to have ballooned into the air, making the ground where they landed seem snow-covered with their silk.

== Distance and height achieved ==
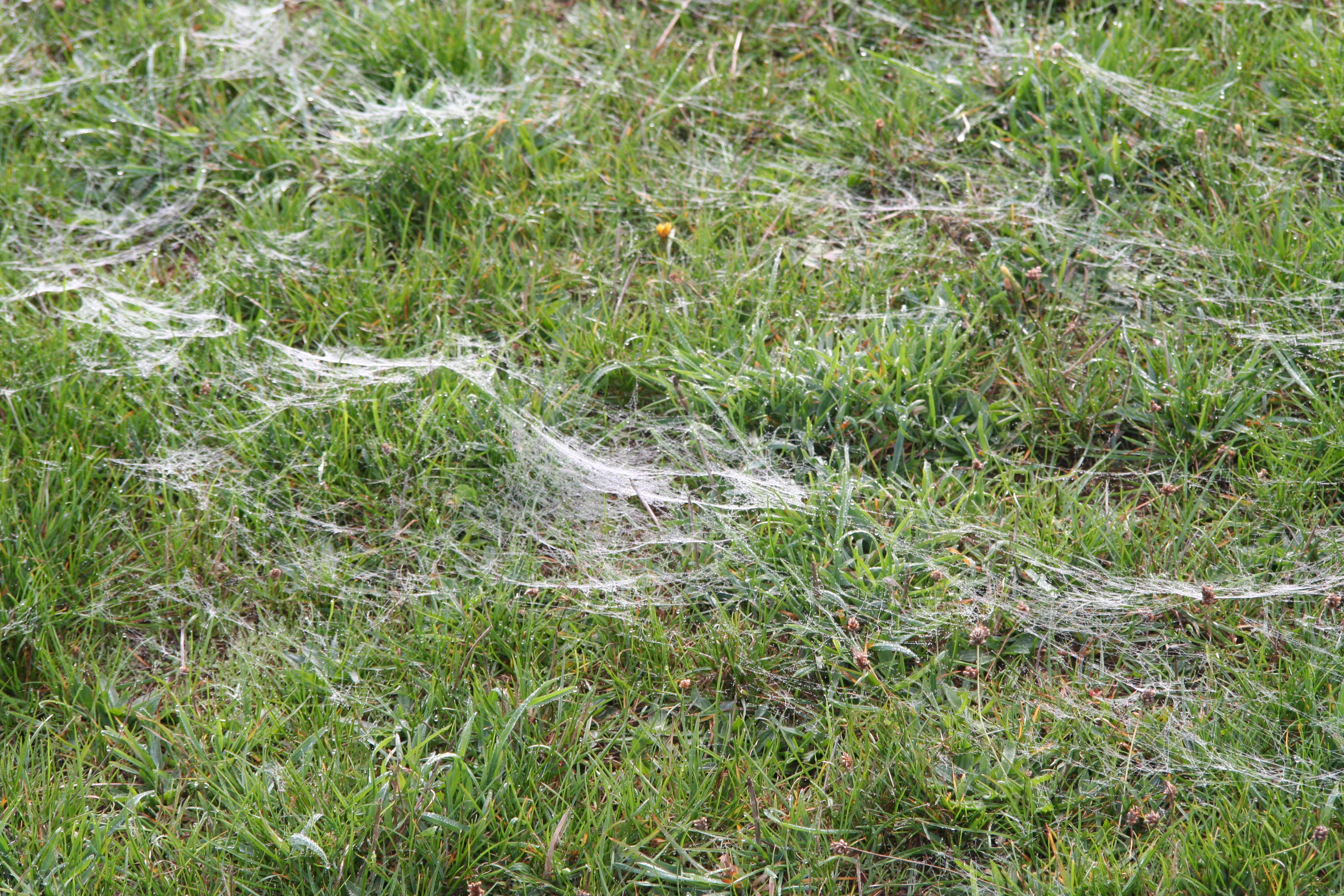
Threads of silk following a mass spider ballooning

Most ballooning journeys end after just a few meters of travel, although depending on the spider's mass and posture, a spider might be taken up into a jet stream. The trajectory further depends on the convection air currents and the drag of the silk and parachute to float and travel high up into the upper atmosphere.

Many sailors have reported spiders being caught in their ship's sails over 1,000 miles (1,600 km) from land (Heimer 1988). They have even been detected in atmospheric data balloons collecting air samples at slightly less than 5 kilometers (16,000 ft) above sea level. Evidently, ballooning is the most common way for spiders to invade isolated islands and mountaintops. Spiderlings are known to survive without food while travelling in air currents of jet streams for 25 days or longer.

Some mites and some caterpillars also use silk to disperse through the air.

A close association has been found between ballooning behaviors and the ability for a species of spiders to survive afloat on water. Water-repellent legs keep them alive on both fresh and salt water, enabling them to survive waves up to 0.5 meters in height. In wind many species raised their legs or abdomens to use as sails, propelling themselves across the water's surface. Many species of spiders also drop silk to anchor themselves in place while afloat. Said spiders did not show these behaviors on land, suggesting that they are adaptations to water.

== History ==
Although this phenomenon has been known since the time of Aristotle, the first precise observations were published by the arachnologist John Blackwall in 1827. Several studies have since made it possible to analyze this behavior. One of the most important and extensive studies exploring ballooning was funded by U.S. Department of Agriculture and performed between 1926 and 1931 by a group of scientists. The findings were published in 1939 in a 155-page bulletin compiled by P. A. Glick.

== See also ==
- Charlotte's Web
- Aeroplankton
- "A Noiseless Patient Spider", a poem by Walt Whitman based on spider ballooning behavior
- Organisms at high altitude
- Spider silk
- To Demonstrate How Spiders Fly, documentary short film
