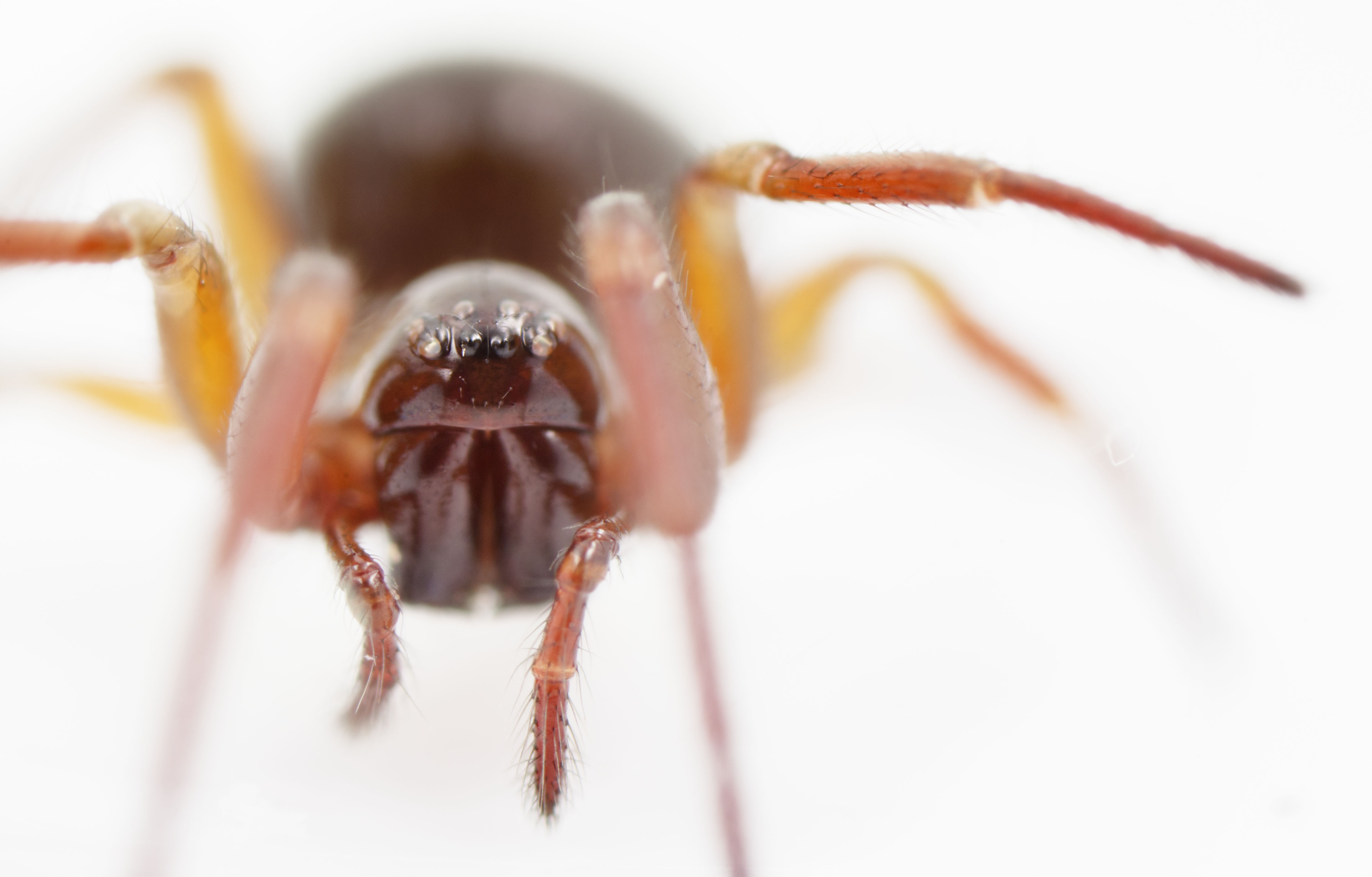
- Gongylidium rufipes

Scientific classification
- Kingdom: Animalia
- Phylum: Arthropoda
- Subphylum: Chelicerata
- Class: Arachnida
- Order: Araneae
- Infraorder: Araneomorphae
- Family: Linyphiidae
- Genus: Gongylidium; Menge, 1868

Type species
- G. rufipes (Linnaeus, 1758)

Species
- G. baltoroi Caporiacco, 1935 – Karakorum; G. rufipes (Linnaeus, 1758) – Europe, Turkey, Russia (Europe to South Siberia), Kazakhstan; G. soror Thaler, 1993 – Italy

= Gongylidium =

Genus of spiders

Gongylidium is a genus of sheet weavers that was first described by Anton Menge in 1868. As of April 2020 it contains three species, found in Asia and Europe: G. baltoroi, G. rufipes, and G. soror.
