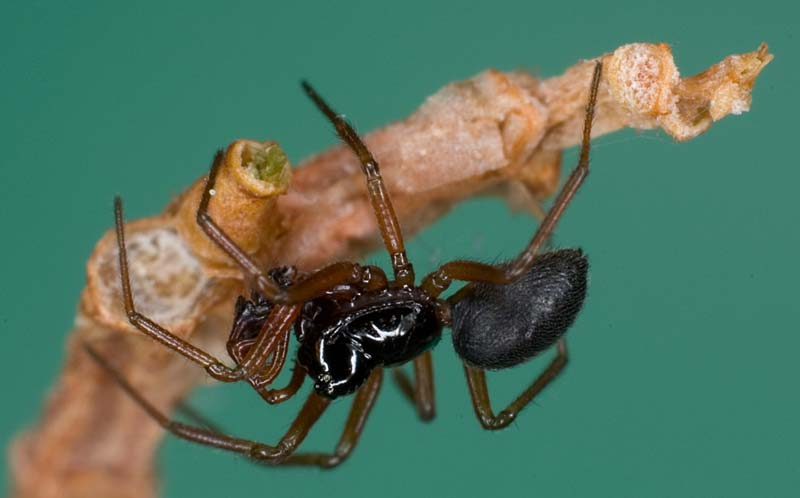
- Male Erigone atra
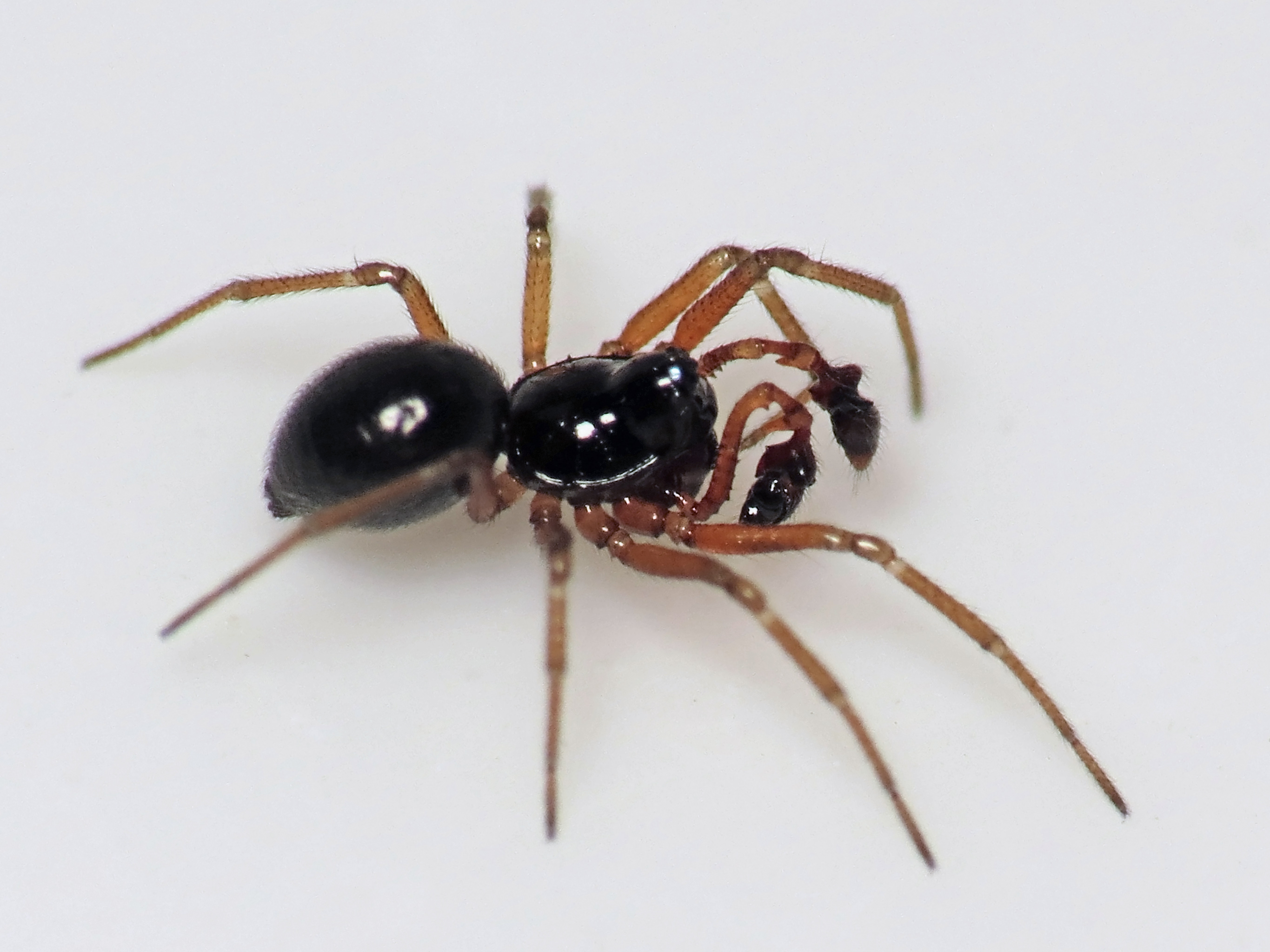
- E. dentipalpis

Scientific classification
- Kingdom: Animalia
- Phylum: Arthropoda
- Subphylum: Chelicerata
- Class: Arachnida
- Order: Araneae
- Infraorder: Araneomorphae
- Family: Linyphiidae
- Subfamily: Erigoninae
- Genus: Erigone; Audouin, 1826

Type species
- E. longipalpis (Sundevall, 1830)

Species
- 103, see text

= Erigone (spider) =

Erigone Temporal range: Neogene– Present

Genus of spiders

Erigone is a genus of dwarf spiders that was first described by Jean Victoire Audouin in 1826. They prey on small insects such as Psylla and flies. One of the distinctive characters for this genus is the presence of teeth bordering the carapace.

== Species ==
As of October 2025, this genus includes 103 species and seven subspecies.

These species have articles on Wikipedia:

- Erigone aletris Crosby & Bishop, 1928 – Alaska, Canada, United States. Introduced to Britain, Italy
- Erigone atra Blackwall, 1833 – North America, Europe, Caucasus, Russia (Europe to Far East), Kazakhstan, Iran, Central Asia, Pakistan, Nepal, Mongolia, China, Taiwan, Korea, Japan. Introduced to Galapagos
- Erigone autumnalis Emerton, 1882 – North and Central America. Introduced to Uruguay, Azores, Europe, Russia (Caucasus), United Arab Emirates, New Caledonia, Hawaii
- Erigone blaesa Crosby & Bishop, 1928 – Alaska, Canada, United States
- Erigone dentigera O. Pickard-Cambridge, 1874 – Canada, United States
- Erigone dentosa O. Pickard-Cambridge, 1894 – Canada, United States, Mexico, Guatemala. Introduced to Europe, Morocco, Turkey
- Erigone prominens Bösenberg & Strand, 1906 – Asia. Introduced to St. Helena, Africa, Australia, New Zealand
- Erigone wiltoni Locket, 1973 – New Zealand, Comoros

Complete species list as of October 2025
- Erigone acuta Tanasevitch, 2021 – Nepal
- Erigone albescens Banks, 1898 – United States
- Erigone aletris Crosby & Bishop, 1928 – Alaska, Canada, United States. Introduced to Britain, Italy
- Erigone allani Chamberlin & Ivie, 1947 – Alaska
- Erigone alsaida Crosby & Bishop, 1928 – Alaska, Canada, United States
- Erigone angela Chamberlin & Ivie, 1939 – United States
- Erigone ansula Irfan, Zhang & Peng, 2022 – China
- Erigone antarctica Simon, 1884 – Chile
- Erigone antegona Chickering, 1970 – Panama
- Erigone apophysalis Tanasevitch, 2017 – Indonesia (Sumatra)
- Erigone aptuna Chickering, 1970 – Panama
- Erigone arctica (White, 1852) – Russia (north-eastern Siberia), Alaska, Canada, Greenland
  - E. a. palaearctica Brændegaard, 1934 – Svalbard, Russia (Europe to West Siberia)
  - E. a. sibirica Kulczyński, 1908 – Russia (Urals, Siberia)
  - E. a. soerenseni Holm, 1956 – Greenland
- Erigone arcticola Chamberlin & Ivie, 1947 – Russia (Europe to Far North-East), Alaska, Canada
- Erigone arctophylacis Crosby & Bishop, 1928 – Canada, United States
- Erigone atra Blackwall, 1833 – North America, Europe, Caucasus, Russia (Europe to Far East), Kazakhstan, Iran, Central Asia, Pakistan, Nepal, Mongolia, China, Taiwan, Korea, Japan. Introduced to Galapagos
- Erigone autumnalis Emerton, 1882 – North and Central America. Introduced to Uruguay, Azores, Europe, Russia (Caucasus), United Arab Emirates, New Caledonia, Hawaii
- Erigone barrowsi Crosby & Bishop, 1928 – United States, Mexico, Bonaire
- Erigone benes Chamberlin & Ivie, 1939 – United States
- Erigone bereta Chickering, 1970 – Panama
- Erigone bifurca Locket, 1982 – India, Malaysia (mainland), Philippines, Indonesia (Krakatau). Introduced to Hawaii
- Erigone blaesa Crosby & Bishop, 1928 – Alaska, Canada, United States
- Erigone brevipes Tu & Li, 2004 – Vietnam
- Erigone canthognatha Chamberlin & Ivie, 1935 – United States
- Erigone capra Simon, 1884 – Europe, Caucasus, Russia (Europe to Far East), Alaska, Canada
- Erigone clavipalpis Millidge, 1991 – Peru
- Erigone coloradensis Keyserling, 1886 – Canada, United States
- Erigone convalescens Jocqué, 1985 – Comoros
- Erigone cristatopalpus Simon, 1884 – North America, Europe, Russia (Urals to Far East), Kazakhstan, Mongolia
- Erigone crosbyi Schenkel, 1950 – United States
- Erigone dentichelis Miller, 1970 – Angola
- Erigone denticulata Chamberlin & Ivie, 1939 – United States
- Erigone dentigera O. Pickard-Cambridge, 1874 – Canada, United States
- Erigone dentipalpis (Wider, 1834) – Europe, North Africa, Turkey, Caucasus, Russia (Europe to Far East), Kazakhstan, Iran, Central Asia, Pakistan, India, China. Introduced to Canada
  - E. d. syriaca O. Pickard-Cambridge, 1872 – Syria
- Erigone dentosa O. Pickard-Cambridge, 1894 – Canada, United States, Mexico, Guatemala. Introduced to Europe, Morocco, Turkey
- Erigone digena Chickering, 1970 – Panama, Jamaica, Puerto Rico
- Erigone dipona Chickering, 1970 – Panama
- Erigone dumitrescuae Georgescu, 1969 – Romania
- Erigone edentata Saito & Ono, 2001 – Korea, Japan
- Erigone eisenschmidti Wunderlich, 1976 – Australia (Queensland)
- Erigone ephala Crosby & Bishop, 1928 – Canada, United States
- Erigone fellita Keyserling, 1886 – Peru
- Erigone fluminea Millidge, 1991 – Venezuela
- Erigone grandidens Tu & Li, 2004 – China, Vietnam
- Erigone himeshimensis Strand, 1918 – Japan
- Erigone hydrophytae Ivie & Barrows, 1935 – United States
- Erigone hypenema Crosby & Bishop, 1928 – United States
- Erigone hypoarctica Eskov, 1989 – Russia (Europe to Far East)
- Erigone infernalis Keyserling, 1886 – United States
- Erigone irrita Jocqué, 1984 – South Africa
- Erigone jaegeri Baehr, 1984 – Central Europe, China
- Erigone jammu Tanasevitch, 2018 – India
- Erigone jugorum Simon, 1884 – France (Pyrenees)
- Erigone kazhiensis Irfan, Zhang & Peng, 2025 – China
- Erigone koratensis Strand, 1918 – Japan
- Erigone koshiensis Oi, 1960 – China, Korea, Taiwan, Japan
- Erigone lata Song & Li, 2008 – China
- Erigone longipalpis (Sundevall, 1830) – Europe, Caucasus, Russia (Europe to Middle Siberia), China, Japan (type species)
  - E. l. pirini Deltshev, 1983 – Bulgaria
- Erigone malvari Barrion & Litsinger, 1995 – Philippines
- Erigone maritima Kulczyński, 1902 – Western, Central and Northern Europe, Russia (Altai)
- Erigone matanuskae Chamberlin & Ivie, 1947 – Alaska
- Erigone miniata Baert, 1990 – Galapagos
- Erigone monterreyensis Gertsch & Davis, 1937 – Mexico
- Erigone neocaledonica Kritscher, 1966 – New Caledonia
- Erigone nepalensis Wunderlich, 1983 – Nepal
- Erigone nigrimana Thorell, 1875 – Italy
- Erigone nitidithorax Miller, 1970 – Angola
- Erigone ostiaria Crosby & Bishop, 1928 – United States
- Erigone palustris Millidge, 1991 – Peru. Introduced to Falkland Is.
- Erigone paradisicola Crosby & Bishop, 1928 – Canada, United States
- Erigone pauperula (Bösenberg & Strand, 1906) – Japan
- Erigone personata Gertsch & Davis, 1936 – United States
- Erigone poeyi Simon, 1898 – St. Vincent
- Erigone praecursa Chamberlin & Ivie, 1939 – United States
- Erigone prominens Bösenberg & Strand, 1906 – Asia. Introduced to St. Helena, Africa, Australia, New Zealand
- Erigone promiscua (O. Pickard-Cambridge, 1873) – Western Europe
- Erigone psychrophila Thorell, 1871 – North America, Northern Europe, Russia (Europe to East Siberia)
- Erigone reducta Schenkel, 1950 – United States
- Erigone remota L. Koch, 1869 – Europe, Russia (Europe to north-east Siberia), Kyrgyzstan
  - E. r. dentigera Simon, 1926 – Switzerland
- Erigone rohtangensis Tikader, 1981 – India
- Erigone rutila Millidge, 1995 – Thailand
- Erigone sagibia Strand, 1918 – Japan
- Erigone sagicola Dönitz & Strand, 1906 – Japan
- Erigone sinensis Schenkel, 1936 – Russia (West Siberia to Far East), Kazakhstan, Kyrgyzstan, Mongolia, China
- Erigone sirimonensis Bosmans, 1977 – Kenya
- Erigone stygia Gertsch, 1973 – Hawaii
- Erigone sumatrana Tanasevitch, 2017 – Indonesia (Sumatra)
- Erigone svenssoni Holm, 1975 – Scandinavia, Russia (Europe to West Siberia)
- Erigone tamazunchalensis Gertsch & Davis, 1937 – Mexico
- Erigone tanana Chamberlin & Ivie, 1947 – Alaska
- Erigone tenuimana Simon, 1884 – Europe (Alps)
- Erigone tepena Chickering, 1970 – Jamaica
- Erigone tirolensis L. Koch, 1872 – North America, Europe, Russia (Europe to Far North East)
- Erigone tolucana Gertsch & Davis, 1937 – Mexico
- Erigone tristis (Banks, 1892) – United States
- Erigone uintana Chamberlin & Ivie, 1935 – United States
- Erigone uliginosa Millidge, 1991 – Peru
- Erigone watertoni Simon, 1898 – St. Vincent
- Erigone welchi Jackson, 1911 – Ireland, Britain, Scandinavia, Estonia, Latvia
- Erigone whitneyana Chamberlin & Ivie, 1935 – United States
- Erigone whymperi O. Pickard-Cambridge, 1877 – Canada, Greenland, Faeroes, Norway, Russia (Europe, West Siberia), Mongolia
  - E. w. minor Jackson, 1933 – Canada
- Erigone wiltoni Locket, 1973 – New Zealand, Comoros
- Erigone zabluta Keyserling, 1886 – Peru
- Erigone zheduoshanensis Song & Li, 2008 – China
