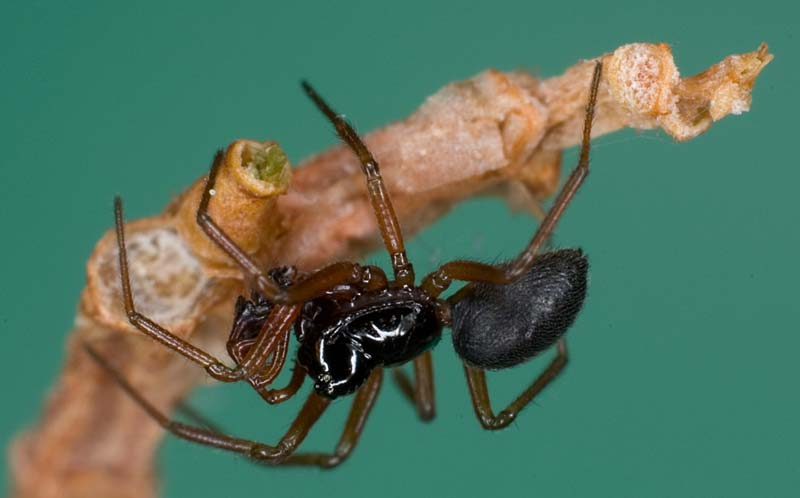
- Male Erigone atra

Scientific classification
- Kingdom: Animalia
- Phylum: Arthropoda
- Subphylum: Chelicerata
- Class: Arachnida
- Order: Araneae
- Infraorder: Araneomorphae
- Family: Linyphiidae
- Subfamily: Erigoninae

Genera
- Atypena; Eridantes; Erigone; Hylyphantes; Mermessus; Many more

= Erigoninae =

Dwarf spiders

Subfamily of spiders

Erigoninae are the largest subfamily of sheet weavers (Linyphiidae), which is itself the second largest spider family. In the United States they are known as dwarf spiders, while they are called money spiders in England. The exact taxonomic limits of the subfamily are not yet known.

Erigoninae are the most numerous of the sheet weavers, with more than 2,000 described species.

Many species live in leaf litter and build minute sheet webs.

These spiders probably are more important as members of the beneficial complex of predators in agroecosystems than is generally known. One species, Atypena formosana, lives in colonies in wetland habitats, where it builds nets just above the water line in rice fields to hunt planthopper nymphs.

The most well-known genus is Erigone.

== Description ==
Most are very small (some less than 1 mm, very few up to 6 mm) spiders that balloon both as spiderlings and adults.

Many males have bizarre projections on their carapaces, including lobes, turrets, grooves, pits and modified hairs. The function of these projections is little understood, but is presumed to be involved with courtship. In a few species the females have been observed to grip the males by the pits or grooves during copulation, using their chelicerae. They later ingested secretions produced by the male prosomic glands after depositing saliva-like fluid on them.

== Distribution ==
More than 300 species occur in northern Europe, comprising about one fourth of the spider fauna there. About 650 are known from North America. While they are the dominant spider group of the temperate and cold regions of the Northern Hemisphere they are less diverse in the Southern Hemisphere. No native species have been found from New Zealand and Australia.
