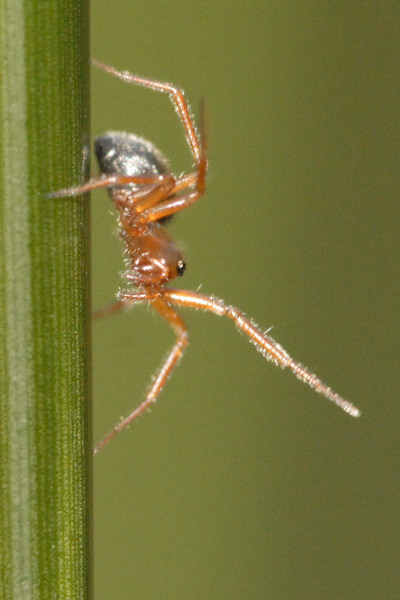
- Walckenaeria acuminata from Commanster, Belgian High Ardennes

Scientific classification
- Kingdom: Animalia
- Phylum: Arthropoda
- Subphylum: Chelicerata
- Class: Arachnida
- Order: Araneae
- Infraorder: Araneomorphae
- Family: Linyphiidae
- Genus: Walckenaeria; Blackwall, 1833

Type species
- W. acuminata Blackwall, 1833

Species
- 195, see text

Synonyms
- Cornicularia Menge, 1869; Paragonatium Schenkel, 1927; Prosopotheca Simon, 1884; Tigellinus Simon, 1884; Trachynella Brændegaard, 1932; Wideria Simon, 1864

= Walckenaeria =

Genus of spiders

Walckenaeria is a genus of dwarf spiders that was first described by John Blackwall in 1833. It is a senior synonym of Paragonatium, as well as Wideria, Cornicularia, Prosopotheca, Tigellinus, and Trachynella.

Some males in this group have eyes set up on mounds or turrets. In extreme cases, several eyes are on a stalk taller than the carapace itself.

== Species ==
As of September 2020 it contains 195 species and two subspecies:

- W. abantensis Wunderlich, 1995 – Albania, Greece, Turkey
- W. aberdarensis (Holm, 1962) – Kenya
- W. acuminata Blackwall, 1833 (type) – Europe, Caucasus, Iran
- W. aenea Millidge, 1983 – Mexico
- W. afur Thaler, 1984 – Canary Is.
- W. aksoyi Seyyar, Demir & Türkes, 2008 – Turkey
- W. alba Wunderlich, 1987 – Canary Is.
- W. allopatriae Jocqué & Scharff, 1986 – Tanzania
- W. alticeps (Denis, 1952) – Europe, Turkey, Caucasus, Russia (Europe to Middle Siberia), Iran
- W. anceps Millidge, 1983 – Canada
- W. angelica Millidge, 1979 – Italy
- W. angustifrons (Simon, 1884) – France
- W. antica (Wider, 1834) – Europe, Turkey, Caucasus, Russia (Europe to South Siberia), Kyrgyzstan, China, Korea, Japan
- W. aprilis Millidge, 1983 – USA
- W. arcana Millidge, 1983 – Mexico
- W. arctica Millidge, 1983 – USA, Canada
- W. asymmetrica Song & Li, 2011 – China
- W. atrotibialis (O. Pickard-Cambridge, 1878) – North America, Europe, Turkey, Caucasus, Russia (Europe to South Siberia), Kazakhstan, Kyrgyzstan
- W. auranticeps (Emerton, 1882) – Russia (South Siberia to Far East), Canada, USA
- W. aurata Millidge, 1983 – Mexico
- W. baborensis Bosmans, 1993 – Algeria
- W. basarukini Eskov & Marusik, 1994 – Russia (Far East)
- W. bifasciculata Tanasevitch, 1987 – Azerbaijan, Armenia
- W. bifida Millidge, 1983 – USA
- W. blanda Millidge, 1983 – USA
- W. breviaria (Crosby & Bishop, 1931) – USA
- W. brevicornis (Emerton, 1882) – USA
- W. brucei (Tullgren, 1955) – Sweden
- W. camposi Wunderlich, 1992 – Canary Is.
- W. capito (Westring, 1861) – Canada, Europe, Caucasus, Russia (Europe to Far East), Korea
- W. carolina Millidge, 1983 – USA
- W. castanea (Emerton, 1882) – USA, Canada, Greenland
- W. cavernicola Wunderlich, 1992 – Canary Is.
- W. chikunii Saito & Ono, 2001 – Korea, Japan
- W. chiyokoae Saito, 1988 – Japan
- W. christae Wunderlich, 1995 – Greece
- W. cirriceps Thaler, 1996 – Greece, Turkey
- W. clavicornis (Emerton, 1882) – North America, Europe, Russia (Europe to Far East), China, Mongolia, Japan
- W. claviloba Wunderlich, 1995 – Greece (Crete)
- W. clavipalpis Millidge, 1983 – USA, Canada
- W. cognata Holm, 1984 – Tanzania
- W. columbia Millidge, 1983 – USA, Canada
- W. communis (Emerton, 1882) – USA, Canada
- W. coniceps Thaler, 1996 – Greece
- W. coreana (Paik, 1983) – Korea
- W. corniculans (O. Pickard-Cambridge, 1875) – Europe, North Africa, Turkey
- W. cornuella (Chamberlin & Ivie, 1939) – USA, Canada
- W. cretaensis Wunderlich, 1995 – Greece (Crete)
- W. crocata (Simon, 1884) – Canary Is., Algeria
- W. crocea Millidge, 1983 – Mexico
- W. crosbyi (Fage, 1938) – Costa Rica
- W. cucullata (C. L. Koch, 1836) – Europe, Caucasus, Russia (Europe to South Siberia)
- W. cuspidata Blackwall, 1833 – Europe, Russia (Europe to Far East)
  - Walckenaeria c. brevicula (Crosby & Bishop, 1931) – USA, Canada, Greenland
  - Walckenaeria c. obsoleta Chyzer & Kulczyński, 1894 – Hungary
- W. cyprusensis Wunderlich, 1995 – Cyprus
- W. dahaituoensis Song & Li, 2011 – China
- W. dalmasi (Simon, 1915) – Portugal, Spain, France
- W. denisi Thaler, 1984 – Canary Is.
- W. digitata (Emerton, 1913) – USA, Canada
- W. directa (O. Pickard-Cambridge, 1874) – USA, Canada
- W. discolor Millidge, 1983 – Mexico
- W. dixiana (Chamberlin & Ivie, 1944) – USA
- W. dondalei Millidge, 1983 – Canada
- W. dysderoides (Wider, 1834) – Europe, Turkey, Caucasus, Russia (Europe to Far East)
- W. elgonensis Holm, 1984 – Kenya, Uganda
- W. emarginata Millidge, 1983 – USA
- W. erythrina (Simon, 1884) – France (Corsica), Morocco, Algeria, Tunisia
- W. exigua Millidge, 1983 – USA, Canada
- W. extraterrestris Bosmans, 1993 – Algeria, Greece
- W. faceta Millidge, 1983 – Mexico
- W. fallax Millidge, 1983 – Canada
- W. ferruginea Seo, 1991 – China, Korea
- W. floridiana Millidge, 1983 – USA
- W. fraudatrix Millidge, 1983 – Russia (Middle Siberia to Far East), Mongolia, USA (Alaska), Canada
- W. furcillata (Menge, 1869) – Europe, Turkey, Russia (Europe to West Siberia), Korea, Japan
- W. fusciceps Millidge, 1983 – Canada
- W. fuscocephala Wunderlich, 1987 – Canary Is.
- W. galilea Tanasevitch, 2016 – Israel
- W. gertschi Millidge, 1983 – Mexico
- W. gologolensis Scharff, 1990 – Tanzania
- W. golovatchi Eskov & Marusik, 1994 – Russia (Far East), Japan
- W. gomerensis Wunderlich, 1987 – Canary Is.
- W. grancanariensis Wunderlich, 2011 – Canary Is.
- W. grandis (Wunderlich, 1992) – Azores
- W. hamus Wunderlich, 1995 – Greece (Crete)
- W. heimbergi Bosmans, 2007 – Morocco
- W. helenae Millidge, 1983 – USA
- W. hierropalma Wunderlich, 1987 – Canary Is.
- W. ichifusaensis Saito & Ono, 2001 – Korea, Japan
- W. incisa (O. Pickard-Cambridge, 1871) – Europe
- W. incompleta Wunderlich, 1992 – Canary Is.
- W. indirecta (O. Pickard-Cambridge, 1874) – USA, Canada
- W. inflexa (Westring, 1861) – Sweden
- W. insperata Millidge, 1979 – Italy
- W. intoleranda (Keyserling, 1886) – Costa Rica, Panama, Colombia
- W. iviei Millidge, 1983 – Mexico
- W. jinlin Yin & Bao, 2012 – China
- W. jocquei Holm, 1984 – Malawi
- W. kabyliana Bosmans, 1993 – Algeria
- W. karpinskii (O. Pickard-Cambridge, 1873) – North America, Scandinavia, Lithuania, Russia (Europe to Far East), China, Mongolia
- W. katanda Marusik, Hippa & Koponen, 1996 – Russia (South Siberia), Kazakhstan
- W. kazakhstanica Eskov, 1995 – Russia (Urals to South Siberia), Kazakhstan
- W. kigogensis Scharff, 1990 – Tanzania
- W. kochi (O. Pickard-Cambridge, 1873) – Canada, Europe, Russia (Europe to South Siberia, Kamchatka), Kazakhstan
- W. koenboutjei Baert, 1994 – Russia (Middle Siberia to Far East)
- W. korobeinikovi Esyunin & Efimik, 1996 – Russia (Europe to Far East), Japan
- W. kulalensis Holm, 1984 – Kenya
- W. languida (Simon, 1915) – Morocco, Algeria, France, Italy, Switzerland, Austria
- W. latens Millidge, 1983 – USA
- W. lepida (Kulczyński, 1885) – North America, Finland, Russia (Europe to Far East)
- W. maesta Millidge, 1983 – USA
- W. mariannae Bosmans, 1993 – Algeria
- W. martensi Wunderlich, 1972 – India, Nepal
- W. mauensis Holm, 1984 – Kenya
- W. meruensis Tullgren, 1910 – Tanzania
- W. mesus (Chamberlin, 1949) – USA
- W. mexicana Millidge, 1983 – Mexico
- W. microps Holm, 1984 – Kenya, Uganda
- W. microspinosa Wunderlich, 2012 – Canary Is.
- W. microspiralis Millidge, 1983 – USA, Canada
- W. minuscula Holm, 1984 – Kenya
- W. minuta (Emerton, 1882) – USA
- W. mitrata (Menge, 1868) – Europe, Russia (Europe to Middle Siberia)
- W. monoceras (Chamberlin & Ivie, 1947) – USA
- W. monoceros (Wider, 1834) – Europe, Azerbaijan, Central Asia
- W. neglecta Bosmans, 1993 – Algeria
- W. ngorongoroensis Holm, 1984 – Tanzania
- W. nigeriensis Locket & Russell-Smith, 1980 – Nigeria, Kenya
- W. nishikawai Saito, 1986 – Russia (Sakhalin, Kurile Is.), Japan
- W. nodosa O. Pickard-Cambridge, 1873 – Europe, Russia (Europe to Far East), China, Japan
- W. nudipalpis (Westring, 1851) – Europe, Azerbaijan, Russia (Europe to Far East), Japan
- W. obtusa Blackwall, 1836 – Europe, Russia (Europe to Far East)
- W. occidentalis Millidge, 1983 – USA
- W. ocularis Holm, 1984 – Kenya
- W. oregona Millidge, 1983 – USA
- W. orghidani Georgescu, 1977 – Cuba
- W. orientalis (Oliger, 1985) – Russia (Far East), Korea, Japan
- W. pallida (Emerton, 1882) – USA, Canada
- W. palmgreni Eskov & Marusik, 1994 – Russia (Middle Siberia to Far East), Mongolia
- W. palmierro Wunderlich, 1987 – Canary Is.
- W. palustris Millidge, 1983 – Canada
- W. parvicornis Wunderlich, 1995 – Mongolia
- W. pellax Millidge, 1983 – USA, Canada
- W. perdita (Chamberlin, 1949) – USA
- W. picetorum (Palmgren, 1976) – Sweden, Finland, Russia (Europe to Far East)
- W. pinocchio (Kaston, 1945) – USA, Canada
- W. pinoensis Wunderlich, 1992 – Canary Is.
- W. placida (Banks, 1892) – USA
- W. plumata Millidge, 1979 – Italy
- W. prominens Millidge, 1983 – Canada
- W. puella Millidge, 1983 – USA
- W. pullata Millidge, 1983 – USA, Canada
- W. pyrenaea (Denis, 1952) – France
- W. reclusa Millidge, 1983 – USA
- W. redneri Millidge, 1983 – USA, Canada
- W. rufula Millidge, 1983 – Mexico
- W. rutilis Millidge, 1983 – Mexico
- W. ruwenzoriensis (Holm, 1962) – Congo, Uganda
- W. saetigera Tanasevitch, 2011 – India
- W. saniuana (Chamberlin & Ivie, 1939) – USA
- W. serrata Millidge, 1983 – USA
- W. simplex Chyzer, 1894 – Germany to Greece
- W. solivaga Millidge, 1983 – USA
- W. spiralis (Emerton, 1882) – Russia (Far North-East), Canada, USA
- W. stepposa Tanasevitch & Piterkina, 2007 – Kazakhstan
- W. striata Wunderlich, 1987 – Canary Is.
- W. stylifrons (O. Pickard-Cambridge, 1875) – Europe
- W. subdirecta Millidge, 1983 – USA, Canada
- W. subpallida Millidge, 1983 – USA
- W. subspiralis Millidge, 1983 – USA, Canada
- W. subterranea Wunderlich, 2011 – Canary Is.
- W. subvigilax Millidge, 1983 – USA
- W. supercilia Seo, 2018 – Korea
- W. suspecta (Kulczyński, 1882) – Poland, Slovakia
- W. tanzaniensis Jocqué & Scharff, 1986 – Tanzania
- W. teideensis Wunderlich, 1992 – Canary Is.
- W. tenella Millidge, 1983 – USA, Canada
- W. tenuitibialis Bosmans, 1993 – Algeria
- W. teres Millidge, 1983 – Canada
- W. thrinax (Chamberlin & Ivie, 1933) – USA
- W. tibialis (Emerton, 1882) – USA, Canada
- W. tilos Wunderlich, 2011 – Canary Is.
- W. torta Bosmans, 1993 – Algeria
- W. tricornis (Emerton, 1882) – USA, Canada
- W. tumida (Crosby & Bishop, 1931) – USA, Canada
- W. turbulenta Bosmans, 1993 – Algeria
- W. tystchenkoi Eskov & Marusik, 1994 – Russia (Far North-East to Sakhalin)
- W. uenoi Saito & Irie, 1992 – Japan
- W. unicornis O. Pickard-Cambridge, 1861 – Europe, Russia (Europe to West Siberia), Kazakhstan
- W. uzungwensis Scharff, 1990 – Tanzania
- W. vigilax (Blackwall, 1853) – North America, Europe, Caucasus, Russia (Europe to Far North-East))
- W. vilbasteae Wunderlich, 1980 – Estonia
- W. weber (Chamberlin, 1949) – USA
- W. westringi Strand, 1903 – Norway
- W. wunderlichi Tanasevitch, 1983 – Ukraine, Russia (Europe), Kazakhstan, Uzbekistan
- W. yunnanensis Xia, Zhang, Gao, Fei & Kim, 2001 – China

Formerly included:

- W. anceps Xu, 1985 (Transferred to Argyrodes)
- W. anguilliformis Xia, Zhang, Gao, Fei & Kim, 2001 (Transferred to Shaanxinus)
- W. bella (Paik, 1978) (Transferred to Paikiniana)
- W. caobangensis Tu & Li, 2004 (Transferred to Nasoona)
- W. cylindrica Xu, 1994 (Transferred to Paikiniana)
- W. dentata Zhu & Zhou, 1988 (Transferred to Dactylopisthes)
- W. imadatei (Oi, 1964) (Transferred to Oia)
- W. iriei Ono, 2007 (Transferred to Paikiniana)
- W. kamakuraensis (Oi, 1960) (Transferred to Baryphymula)
- W. keikoae Saito, 1988 (Transferred to Paikiniana)
- W. lurida Seo, 1991 (Transferred to Paikiniana)
- W. mira (Oi, 1960) (Transferred to Paikiniana)
- W. patagonica Tullgren, 1901 (Transferred to Neomaso)
- W. pini (Holm, 1950) (Transferred to Baryphyma)
- W. saitoi Ono, 1991 (Transferred to Ainerigone)
- W. selma (Chamberlin, 1949) (Transferred to Scylaceus)
- W. sounkyoensis Saito, 1986 (Transferred to Okhotigone)
- W. transversa (Crosby, 1905) (Transferred to Tennesseellum)
- W. vulgaris (Oi, 1960) (Transferred to Paikiniana)
- W. xui Platnick, 1989 (Transferred to Argyrodes)

Nomina dubia

- W. bicolor Blackwall, 1841
- W. dulciacensis (Denis, 1950
- W. exilis Blackwall, 1853
- W. fusca Roșca, 1935
- W. mengei Bösenberg, 1902
- W. parva Blackwall, 1841
- W. vafra Blackwall, 1856
