= N. vulgaris =

N. vulgaris may refer to:

- Nitrobacter vulgaris, a rod-shaped, Gram-negative and chemoautotrophic bacterium species
- Novafroneta vulgaris, a spider species in the genus Novafroneta and the Linyphiidae

== Synonyms ==
- Nicrophorus vulgaris, a synonym for Nicrophorus vespillo, a burying beetle species

== See also ==
- Vulgaris (disambiguation)
