= Bulga =

Bulga may refer to:

- Bulga, New South Wales, a locality in the Singleton Council region, New South Wales, Australia
- Bulga, Victoria, a locality in the Rural City of Swan Hill, Victoria, Australia
- Bulga Land District, a land district (cadastral division) of Western Australia
- Bulga Coal, an Australian mining company
- Tarra-Bulga National Park, a national park in eastern Victoria, Australia
- Biriwal Bulga National Park a national park in New South Wales, Australia
- Bulga (Ethiopia), a historical region in Ethiopia
- Black Bulga State Conservation Area, a park in New South Wales, Australia
- Gáe Bulg (Gáe Bulga), the spear of Cúchulainn in the Ulster Cycle of Irish mythology

== See also ==
- Bulgur, a wheat product
- Bulgar (disambiguation)
- Bolgar (disambiguation)
