= P. vulgaris =

P. vulgaris may refer to:

- Paikiniana vulgaris, a spider species in the genus Paikiniana and the family Linyphiidae
- Phaseolus vulgaris, an herbaceous annual plant species
- Pinguicula vulgaris, a perennial insectivorous plant species
- Primula vulgaris, a garden plant species
- Proteus vulgaris, a rod-shaped Gram negative bacterium species
- Prunella vulgaris, a wild flower species
- Pulsatilla vulgaris, a buttercup species

== See also ==
- Vulgaris (disambiguation)
