= Bolgar =

Bolgar may refer to:

== People ==
- Bolgars, a people of Central Asian origin
- Bolgar language, the extinct language of the Bulgars
- Bolgar languages
- Bolgar Bagryanov, Bulgarian film director
- Bolgar (surname)

== Places ==
- Bolgar Urban Settlement, a municipal formation which the town of Bolgar and one rural locality in Spassky District of the Republic of Tatarstan, Russia are incorporated as
- Bolgar (inhabited locality), several inhabited localities in Russia
- Bolgar Buttress, a buttress in Antarctica
- Volga Bulgaria, called Bolghar in historical sources.
- Bolghar, capital of Volga Bulgaria.

== Other uses ==
- KZT BOLGAR, a Bulgarian tractor manufacturer
- Bolgar, a character in the 2007 Flash Gordon series who replaced Prince Thun

== See also ==
- Bulgar (disambiguation)
- Volgar (disambiguation)
- Vulgar (disambiguation)
- Bolgary, several rural localities in Russia
