= Kidd Mine =

Kidd Township, Timmins area, Ontario

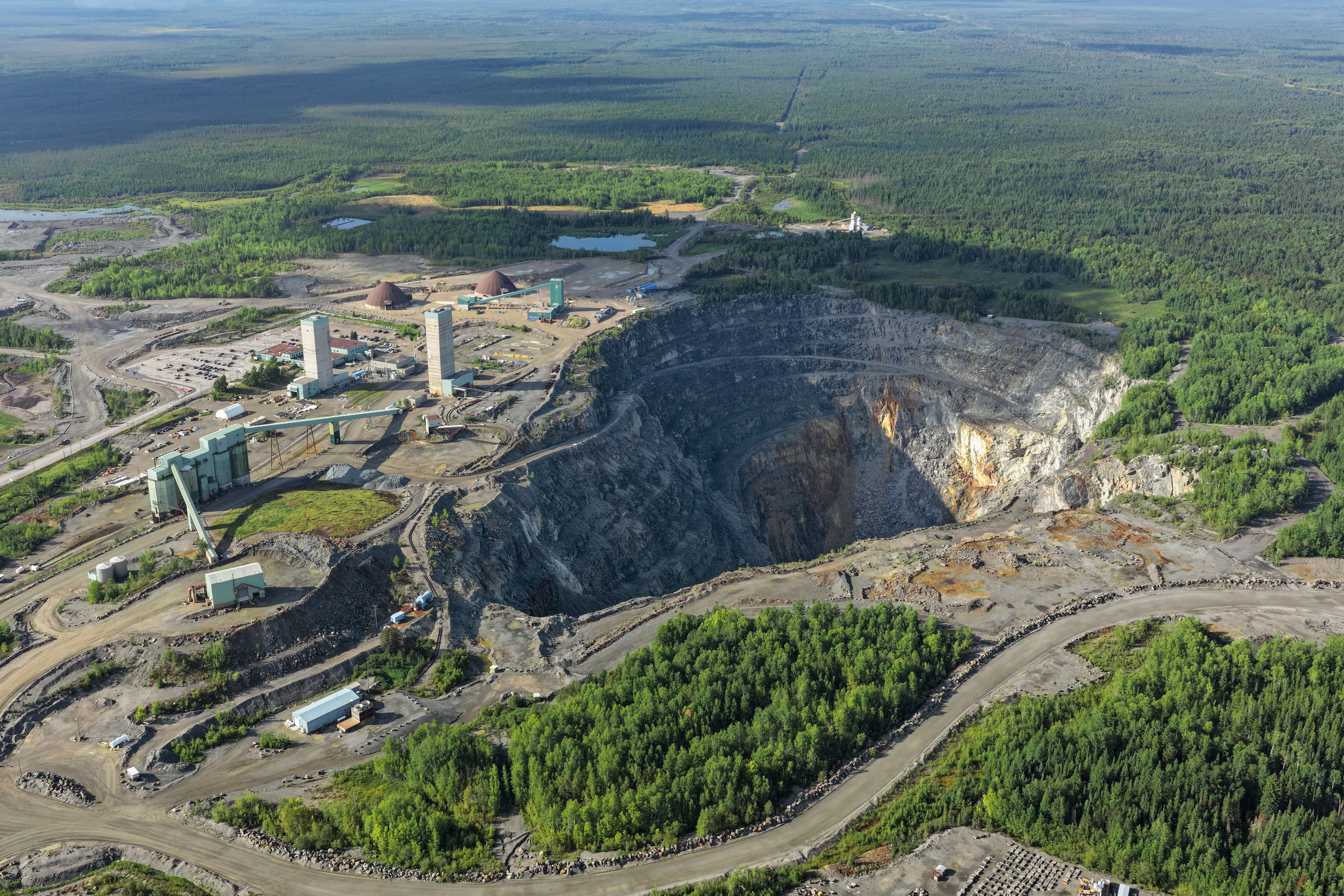
- Kidd Mine in 2026

- Location in Ontario
- Location: Timmins, Ontario, Canada; 48°41′20″N 81°21′55″W
- Products: Zinc, copper and silver concentrates
- Production: Zinc (t): 67,600; Copper (t): 33,500; Silver (oz): 1,654,000
- Financial year: 2019
- Opened: 1966
- Company: Discovery silver (2026-); Glencore Inc. (2013–2026 ) Xstrata (2006–2013); Falconbridge Ltd. (1986–2006); Canada Development Corporation (1981–1986); Texas Gulf Sulfur Company (1963–1981)
- Website: www.kiddoperations.ca
- Acquired: 2013 (takeover of Xstrata)

Kidd Mine or Kidd Creek Mine is an underground base metal (copper-zinc-silver) mine in Timmins, Ontario, Canada. It is owned and operated by Swiss multinational Glencore Inc. The ore deposit was discovered in 1959 by Texas Gulf Sulfur Company. Exploration drilling at the Kidd site began in November 1963. In 1981, it was sold to Canada Development Corporation, then sold in 1986 to Falconbridge Ltd., which in 2006 was acquired by Xstrata, which in turn merged with Glencore in 2013. Ore from the Kidd Mine is processed into concentrate at the Kidd Metallurgical Site, located 27 km (17 mi) southeast of the mine, which until 2010 also smelted the ore and refined the metal produced. Following the closure of most of the Met Site, concentrate is now shipped to Quebec for processing. Kidd Mine is the world's deepest mine below sea level (2,733 m (8,967 ft) below sea level) as well as the deepest copper-zinc mine (3,014 m (9,888 ft) below the surface).

== History ==
An aerial geophysical survey, conducted by Texas Gulf Sulphur Company in March 1959, indicated an anomaly in the Kidd-55 segment warranting ground investigation. A ground electromagnetic survey was conducted in October 1963 and a drill rig started drilling a 600-foot core sample in November. The core, later confirmed by the Union Assay Office in Salt Lake City, showed an average copper content of 1.15%, an average zinc content of 8.64%, and 3.94 ounces of silver per ton. A second hole was drilled in March 1964, followed by two more in early April. The copper-zinc-silver ore deposit at Kidd Mine discovery was announced in a press release after the board of directors meeting on 16 April 1964. Seven drill holes indicated an ore body 800 feet long, 300 feet wide, and a vertical depth of 800 feet.

During the initial exploration of the site, then known as Kidd-55, officers of the company engaged in insider trading in Texas Gulf shares. The ensuing lawsuit by the Securities and Exchange Commission resulted in a landmark decision that established the right of all market participants to have "relatively equal access to material information."

The mine began ore production in 1966, as an open pit mine and eventually evolved into an underground mine. The mine produces copper, zinc, and several other metals.

The mine has the oldest-known flowing water on Earth. A billion-year-old water sample collected from the mine was added to the collection at Ingenium in Ottawa on November 25, 2020.

== Geology ==
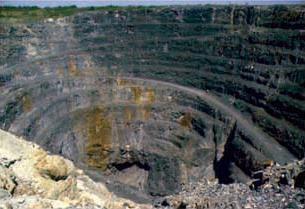
Open pit at Kidd Mine. Volcanogenic massive sulfide ore deposit formed 2.7 billion years ago on an ancient seafloor.

The Kidd deposit is one of the largest volcanogenic massive sulfide ore deposits in the world and one of the world's largest base metal deposits. It lies within the Abitibi greenstone belt.

== Current operation ==
Kidd Mine and Met Site collectively employ approximately 850 employees and contractors. In 2008, the company committed to investing $120 million to extend the production to 2017, and deepen the mine to 9,600 feet (2,900 m). The investment would add 3.4 million tonnes of ore into the mine plan. The expansion included the development of three additional production levels and deepening the ramp from the 9100 level to the 9600 level, where the loading pocket is located. This included an extension of the ventilation and backfill systems to the new sections of the mine. The mine's expected production life has since been extended to 2021. In 2019, exploration drills were set up on the 9,800 level to search out and define the new ore zone.

== Depth ==
Kidd is the deepest base metal mine in the world. The bottom of N° 4 shaft at Kidd Creek Mine D is 3,014.3 metres (9,889 ft) below the surface, 2,735 metres (8,973 ft) below sea level, the deepest accessible non-marine point on Earth.

== See also ==
- List of mines in Ontario
- Volcanology of Canada
- Volcanology of Eastern Canada
- Coleman Mine

== Sources ==
- Hannington, M. D., and Barrie, C. T., editors, (1999). The Giant Kidd Creek Volcanogenic Massive Sulfide Deposit, Western Abitibi Subprovince, Canada: Economic Geology Monograph 10, The Giant Kidd Creek Volcanogenic Massive Sulfide Deposit, Western Abitibi Subprovince, Canada. 672 p.
- John Brooks, "Annals of Finance: A Reasonable Amount of Time," The New Yorker, Nov. 9, 1968, p. 160.
  - Reprinted in John Brooks, Business Adventures. New York: Weybright & Talley, 1969. Ch. 4, pp. 118–144.
