= Kidd Metallurgical Site =

Coordinates: 48°33′00″N 81°04′45″W

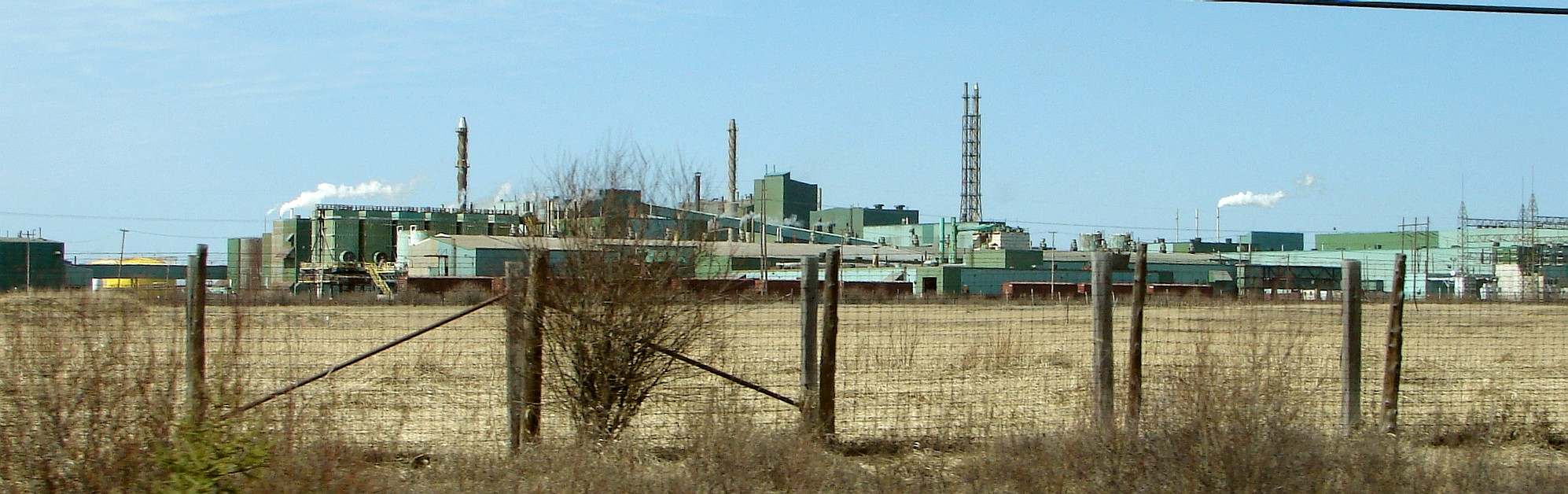
- Met Site as seen from Highway 101 East
- Industry: Mineral processing, Metallurgy
- Headquarters: 10050 Highway 101 East; Timmins, Ontario, Canada
- Products: Zinc concentrate Copper concentrate Prior to May 2010: Zinc; Copper; Cadmium; Indium; Silver-bearing slimes Nickel concentrate Nickel-copper carbonate Liquid SO₂; Sulphuric acid
- Owner: Glencore Inc. (2013– ) Xstrata (2006-2013); Falconbridge Ltd. (1986–2006); Canada Development Corporation (1981–1986); Texas Gulf Sulfur Company (1963–1981)
- Number of employees: 875 (2009)
- Website: https://www.kiddoperations.ca/

The Kidd Metallurgical Site (or Met Site) is a metallurgical facility in Timmins, Ontario, Canada. It is currently owned and operated by Discovery Silver Corporation as of June 2026. It was built in 1980 and was previously owned and operated by Glencore Canada Corporation, Xstrata Copper, and Falconbridge Ltd. The site employs approximately 675 hourly employees.

The plant is 27 kilometres (17 mi) southeast of the Kidd Mine, and houses a concentrator and previously housed a copper smelter and refinery, zinc plant, cadmium plant, indium plant and a sulphuric acid plant. The Met Site was built away from the mine because of the muskeg-like terrain surrounding the mine.

The Met Site processes material from the Kidd Mine and outside sources, and employs 570 people. Of the 570 employees 139 work at the concentrator.

Xstrata announced its plans to close the Metallurgical Site in May 2010. Only the concentrator will remain as the ore will now be shipped to Québec. The demolition of the rest of the plant started in February 2011.

Glencore Canada Corporation announced the end of life of the mine for December 2026. Discovery Silver Corporation bought Kidd Operations in June of 2026 and plan to process Kidd Mine, Pamour, Hoyle and Borden ore in the concentrator.
