= T. communis =

T. communis may refer to:

- Tamus communis, the black bryony, a flowering plant species
- Turritella communis, a medium-sized sea snail species

== See also ==
- Communis (disambiguation)
