= Bolgar (surname) =

Bolgar is a surname literally meaning "Bulgarian person" in several languages. Notable people with the surnamer include:

- Boyan Bolgar, Bulgarian writer
- Hedda Bolgar (1909–2013), American psychoanalyst
- J. Bolgar, student of British mathematician Dan Segal
- Robert Bolgar (1913–1985), an Austro-Hungarian-British classical scholar
- William A. Bolgar, a Ford Hall Forum speaker in 1929
- Dániel Bolgár (b. 1982), Hungarian musician
- Elek Bolgár, ambassador of the People's Republic of Hungary to the United Kingdom, envoy extraordinary
- Tamás Bolgár, Hungarian voivode, King of the Gypsies

== See also ==
- Bulgar (disambiguation)
- Bulgaru
