= Harry and Tonto =

1974 film by Paul Mazursky

- Early theatrical release poster
- Directed by: Paul Mazursky
- Written by: Paul Mazursky; Josh Greenfeld
- Produced by: Paul Mazursky
- Starring: Art Carney; Herbert Berghof; Philip Bruns; Ellen Burstyn; Geraldine Fitzgerald; Larry Hagman; Chief Dan George; Melanie Mayron; Joshua Mostel; Arthur Hunnicutt; Barbara Rhoades; Cliff DeYoung; Avon Long; Tonto (cat)
- Cinematography: Michael Butler
- Edited by: Richard Halsey
- Music by: Bill Conti
- Distributed by: 20th Century-Fox
- Release date: August 12, 1974
- Running time: 115 minutes
- Country: United States
- Language: English
- Budget: $980,000
- Box office: $4.6 million (rentals)

Harry and Tonto is a 1974 American road comedy-drama directed by Paul Mazursky and written by Mazursky and Josh Greenfeld. The film follows a man named Harry who travels cross-country with his pet cat, Tonto. Art Carney won the Academy Award for Best Actor for his performance as Harry.

== Plot ==
Harry Coombes is an elderly widower and retired teacher who is evicted from his Upper West Side apartment in New York City because his building will be razed to build a parking lot. He initially stays in the suburbs with the family of his eldest son Burt, but chooses instead to travel cross-country with his pet cat, Tonto.

Initially planning to fly to Chicago, Harry has a problem with airport security checking his cat carrier. He instead boards a long-distance bus. He disembarks in the countryside so that Tonto can urinate, and the angry bus driver leaves him there. Harry buys a 1955 Chevrolet Bel Air, although his driver's license has expired. During his episodic journey, he befriends a Bible-quoting hitchhiker and an underage runaway named Ginger, with whom he visits an old sweetheart in a retirement home who barely remembers him. He visits his daughter, a bookstore owner in Chicago, with whom he shares a relationship that is prickly but mutually admiring. Harry's shy grandson and Ginger depart for a commune in Colorado in Harry's car, with his blessing, so he and Tonto are on their own again.

Continuing west, Harry accepts a ride with a health-food salesman, meets an attractive hooker on his way to Las Vegas and spends a night in jail with a friendly Indian. He eventually arrives in Los Angeles, where he stays with his youngest son Eddie, a financially strapped real-estate salesman, before finding a place of his own with Tonto.

After Tonto dies, Harry is living alone, making new friends and enjoying the climate. He sees a young cat who looks exactly like Tonto and follows it to the beach, where a child is building a sand castle.

== Cast ==
- Art Carney as Harry Coombes
- Tonto as Tonto
- Herbert Berghof as Jacob Rivetowski
- Ellen Burstyn as Shirley Mallard
- Geraldine Fitzgerald as Jessie Stone
- Larry Hagman as Eddie Coombes
- Chief Dan George as Sam Two Feathers
- Melanie Mayron as Ginger
- Joshua Mostel as Norman Coombes
- Arthur Hunnicutt as Wade Carlton
- Barbara Rhoades as Stephanie, Hooker
- Cliff DeYoung as Burt Coombes Jr.
- Phil Bruns as Burt Coombes
- Dolly Jonah as Elaine Coombes
- Avon Long as Leroy
- Louis Guss as Dominic Santosi
- Cliff Norton as Nick Lewis, Used Car Dealer
- Rashel Novikoff as Mrs. Rothman
- Michael Butler as Hitchhiker
- René Enríquez as Jesús, Deli Manager
- Michael McCleery as Mugger
- Muriel Beerman as Taxi Driver

Sally Marr, mother of Lenny Bruce, also appears in the film as Celia, the cat lady. Jill Mazursky, the daughter of directer Paul Mazursky appears at the end as the girl building the sand castle.

== Production ==
Mazursky wanted James Cagney for the role of Harry, but Cagney declined the offer, as did Laurence Olivier and Cary Grant. Mazursky then saw Art Carney in a play and approached him. Carney initially declined as well, in part because he was about 15 years younger than Harry, but he eventually agreed. Cast as an elderly man, Carney, who was born in 1918, was actually only 13 years older than the actors who played his sons, Larry Hagman and Phil Bruns, and 14 years older than Ellen Burstyn, who played his daughter. Thanks to the makeup of Emmy-winning artist Bob O'Bradovich, Carney was transformed into the elderly Harry.

Carney did not like cats prior to his work in Harry and Tonto, but he established a good relationship with the cats in the film. After filming, the animal wrangler offered Mazursky one of the two cats who played Tonto, but Mazursky declined because his wife had become allergic to them.

Muriel Beerman, who plays the cab driver, was a talkative part-time taxi driver who had driven Mazursky to the casting office one day.

== Reception ==
On the review aggregator website Rotten Tomatoes, 88% of 32 critics' reviews are positive. The website's consensus reads: "Making his sorely belated debut in a big-screen leading role, Art Carney brings Harry and Tonto brilliantly to life." Metacritic, which uses a weighted average, assigned the film a score of 72 out of 100, based on 13 critics, indicating "generally favorable" reviews.

Nora Sayre of The New York Times wrote that Harry and Tonto had been "directed at far too slow a pace, which means that the comic possibilities and the social comment have been diminished. The muted style robs the picture of the point it's meant to make: that imaginative energy transcends the generations."

Variety called the film "pleasant, if commercially unexciting," with an "excellent" performance by Carney.

Roger Ebert awarded the film 4 stars out of 4, praising Carney for a performance that was "totally original, all his own, and worthy of the Academy Award it received."

Gene Siskel of the Chicago Tribune awarded 3.5 out of 4 stars, calling it "an extremely funny movie without a single gag or a Bob Hope punch line. Rather, it's crammed full of believable people who say the kind of screwball things that make your head spin and smile."

In The Monthly Film Bulletin, Jonathan Rosenbaum wrote that the film "presumes to say something smart and 'sophisticated' about everything from urban renewal to Carlos Castaneda's medicinal lore, along with a continuous lesson about growing old gracefully that is dished out at every opportunity; yet it winds up telling us virtually nothing at all."

== Release ==
=== Home media ===
The film was released in VHS format in 1984 by Key Video and on DVD in 2005 by Twentieth Century Fox Home Entertainment.

== Awards and nominations ==
Award	Category	Nominee(s)	Result	Ref.
Academy Awards	Best Actor	Art Carney	Won	
Academy Awards	Best Original Screenplay	Paul Mazursky and Josh Greenfeld	Nominated	
Golden Globe Awards	Best Motion Picture – Musical or Comedy		Nominated	
Golden Globe Awards	Best Actor in a Motion Picture – Musical or Comedy	Art Carney	Won	
Kinema Junpo Awards	Best Foreign Language Film	Paul Mazursky	Won	
National Board of Review Awards	Top Ten Films		5th place	
PATSY Awards	Best Animal Performer in a Motion Picture	Tonto the Cat	Won	
Writers Guild of America Awards	Best Drama – Written Directly for the Screen	Paul Mazursky and Josh Greenfeld	Nominated	

== See also ==
- List of American films of 1974
