= P. commune =

P. commune may refer to:

- Penicillium commune, a fungus species in the genus Penicillium
- Polytrichum commune, the common haircap moss, common hair moss or great goldilocks, a moss species

== See also ==
- Commune (disambiguation)
