= P. communis =

P. communis may refer to:

- Panorpa communis, the common scorpionfly, a species of scorpionfly native to Western Europe
- Pyrgus communis, the common checkered-skipper, a species of butterfly in the family Hesperiidae
- Pyrus communis, the European pear, a species of pear native to central and eastern Europe and southwest Asia

== Synonyms ==
- Phragmites communis, a synonym for Phragmites australis, the common reed, a large perennial grass found in wetlands throughout temperate and tropical regions of the world

== See also ==
- Communis (disambiguation)
