= W. crocea =

W. crocea may refer to:

- Walckenaeria crocea, a very small spider
- Woldmaria crocea, a gilled mushroom
