= L. vulgaris =

L. vulgaris may refer to:

- Linaria vulgaris, a toadflax species
- Lysimachia vulgaris, a herbaceous perennial plant species

== See also ==
- Vulgaris (disambiguation)
