= H. vulgaris =

H. vulgaris may refer to:

- Hippuris vulgaris, the common mare's tail, a common aquatic plant species found in Eurasia
- Hydra vulgaris, a small freshwater hydroid species
- Hydrocotyle vulgaris, the marsh pennywort, a small creeping perennial herb species native to North Africa, Europe, Florida and west to the Caspian region

== See also ==
- Vulgaris (disambiguation)
