= Bolgary =

Bolgary (Russian: Болгары) is the name of several rural localities in Russia:

- Bolgary, Mari El Republic, a village in Mariysky Rural Okrug of Mari-Tureksky District in the Mari El Republic
- Bolgary, Oryol Oblast, a village in Alyabyevsky Selsoviet of Mtsensky District in Oryol Oblast
- Bolgary, Okhansky District, Perm Krai, a village in Okhansky District of Perm Krai
- Bolgary, Permsky District, Perm Krai, a village in Permsky District of Perm Krai
- Bolgary, Republic of Tatarstan, a selo in Spassky District of the Republic of Tatarstan
- Bolgary, Vladimir Oblast, a village in Sobinsky District of Vladimir Oblast
