= Distinguished Canadians =

- Also known as: Interview
- Genre: Talk show
- Presented by: John David Hamilton
- Country of origin: Canada
- Original language: English
- No. of seasons: 2

Production
- Producer: Ain Soodor
- Running time: 30 minutes

Original release
- Network: CBC Television
- Release: 23 August 1971 – 21 August 1972

Distinguished Canadians (originally titled Interview) is a Canadian talk show television series that aired on CBC Television from 1971 to 1972.

== Premise ==
John David Hamilton interviewed guests such as Claude Bissell (academic), Donald Cameron (politician), George Ramsay Cook (historian), Marshall Crowe (Canada Development Corporation), Gratien Gélinas (playwright), Pierre Juneau (CRTC), Georges-Henri Lévesque (priest, sociologist), Wilder Penfield (neurosurgeon), Allison DeForrest Pickett (entomologist), Charlotte Whitton (Ottawa mayor) and John Tuzo Wilson (geoscientist).

== Scheduling ==
This half-hour series, under the original Interview title, was broadcast on Mondays at 10:30 p.m. (Eastern) from 23 August to 20 September 1971 in the first season.

The second-season episodes were aired on Sundays at 2:00 p.m. from 16 April 1972 to 4 June 1972, after which it returned to the Monday 10:30 p.m. time slot until its final broadcast on 21 August 1972. The title changed to Distinguished Canadians as of the 30 April 1972 episode.

== Reception ==
In a mixed review, Keith Ashwell of the Edmonton Journal wrote, "In some ways Distinguished Canadians is interesting. The camera doesn't wander. It likes hard-cropped shots of a face talking. The program insists on a convivial atmosphere here so that the inquisition is surreptitious, the confessions seemingly self-generated. But where it fails, as it did so dismally with Juneau is when J.D. is lulled by his own urbane, assuring style." The Calgary Herald's Bob Shiels said of an episode of Hamilton "talking to" Hugh MacLennan, "Talking heads. Take away the cameras and they might have had a fair-to-middling radio show". In another review, Shiels said the show has "no production values whatsoever. This CBC offering is simply a conversation – the kind of show identified as radio with a camera pointed at it."
