= M. communis =

M. communis may refer to:

- Macrozamia communis, the burrawang, a cycad species found on the east coast of New South Wales, Australia
- Melocactus communis, the Turk's cap cactus, a plant species in the genus Melocactus
- Myrtus communis, the common myrtle or true myrtle, a widespread plant species in the Mediterranean region

== Synonyms ==
- Merulius communis, a synonym for Schizophyllum commune, the world's most widely distributed mushroom

== See also ==
- Communis (disambiguation)
