= M. vulgaris =

M. vulgaris may refer to:

- Monograptus vulgaris, a graptolite present in the Ludlow Group
- Mycena vulgaris, a saprotrophic mushroom species in the genus Mycena

== See also ==
- Vulgaris (disambiguation)
