= Horne Smelter =

Industrial complex in Rouyn-Noranda, Canada

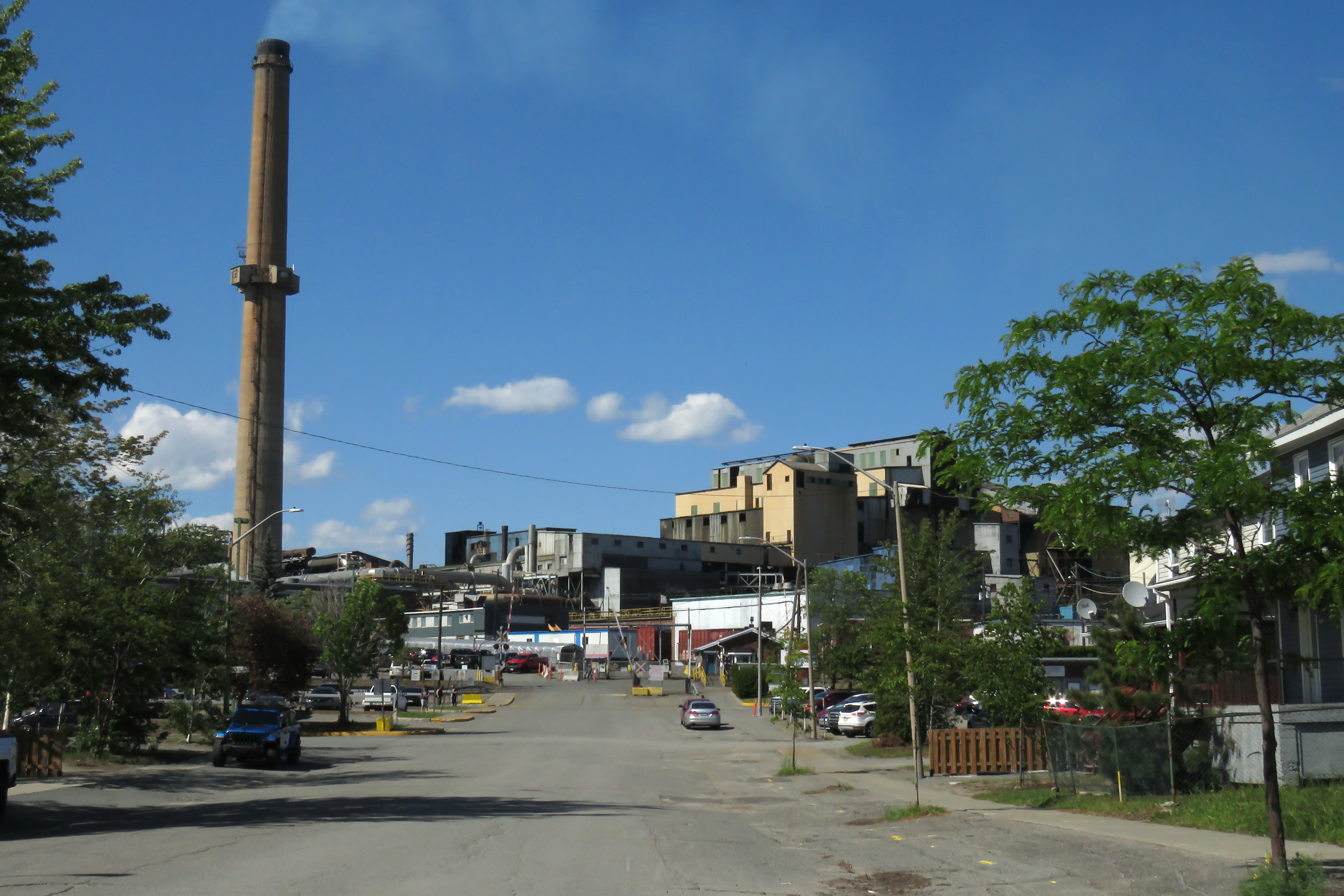
- The Horne Smelter
- Location: 101 Av. Portelance, Rouyn-Noranda, QC J9X 5B6; Rouyn-Noranda, Québec, Canada
- Coordinates: 48.25328°N 79.01358°W
- Industry: Metallurgy
- Products: Copper, Precious metals, Sulfuric acid
- Employees: 650
- Owners: Noranda (1927–2005), Falconbridge (2005–2006); Xstrata (2006–2013), Glencore (since 2013)
- Website: https://www.glencore.ca/en/horne/

The Horne Smelter (French: Fonderie Horne) is an industrial complex in Rouyn-Noranda, Quebec. It is Canada's only copper smelter, and the largest processor of metals from electronic scrap in North America.

== History ==
The smelter is named after prospector Edmund Horne. The first copper pour took place on December 17, 1927.

== Operations ==
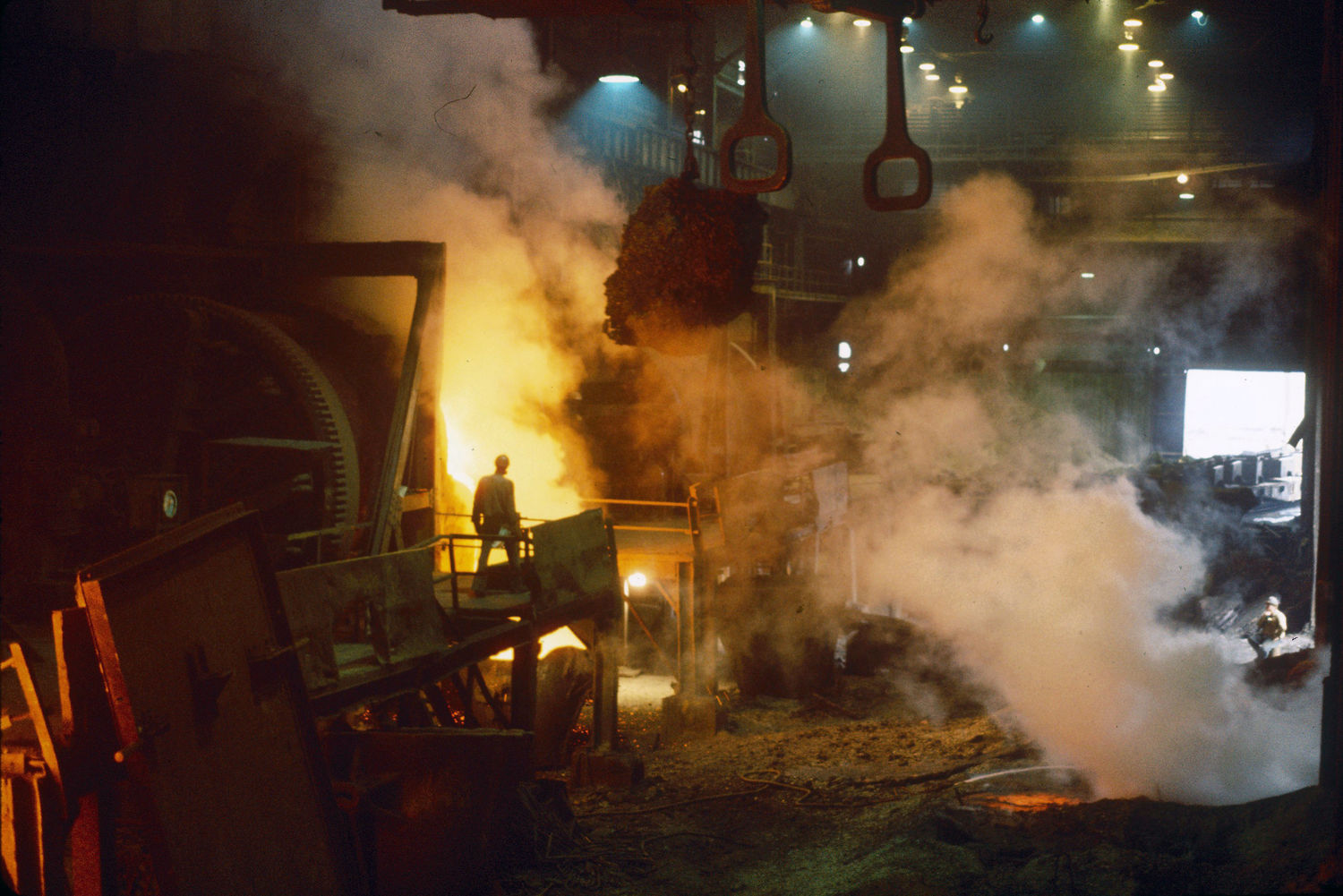
Reverberatory furnaces in 1975.

The smelter produces copper anodes of 99.1% purity. Its feedstock consists of both copper concentrate sourced from mines and shredded electronic waste. Copper from electronic scrap comprises 15% of its production.

In addition to copper and other metals, the facility also produces sulfuric acid. Commissioned in 1989, production from the sulfuric acid plant amounts to 640,000 metric tons per year, recovering some 96% of the sulfur generated by the smelting process.

== Economic impact ==
The smelter employs around 650 people. Its economic benefit has been placed at $500 million per year.

== Environmental issues ==
=== Emissions ===
Emitting 100 nanograms of arsenic per cubic metre, the Horne Smelter operates at 33 times the determined arsenic threshold acceptable by the Quebec Ministry of Environment.

=== Public health ===
A June 2022 study published by Quebec's public health body, the Institut national de santé publique du Québec, showed that the smelter had exposed the town of Rouyn-Noranda to harmful levels of arsenic and cadmium for decades, resulting in elevated levels of lung cancer. Sections of the report which would elicit a stronger correlation between arsenic emissions from the smelter and lung cancer in the local population were removed by Dr. Horacio Arruda, former Public Health Director of Quebec. Arruda claims he had no intention of distorting the report results.

Emissions control discussions between the Quebec government and Glencore, the company owning the smelter, have agreed on the short-term inability of the corporation to reduce emissions on grounds of regional economic reliance on the smelter, despite public opposition to the current threshold.

The Quebec government has since announced the relocation of 200 households from the Rouyn-Noranda region outside of determined buffer zones from the foundry, without prior input from locals, signalling issues of procedural justice. While some locals view the relocation as beneficial to their safety, others are torn at the loss of their communities. Public support for the Stop Toxic Emissions and Waste movement against the emissions have also contributed to increased socio-economic tensions in the area as the smelter provides the region with 600 jobs.

The Quebec government has required that Glencore propose plans to drastically reduce emissions, but fails to outline any timeframe within which such standards should be met. Studies have shown that sustained exposure to high arsenic levels expected to be experienced by locals within the undefined action timeline will cause undue cases of cancer, compounded by threats of residual arsenic concentrations in the environment past emissions control due to pollution of snow deposits.

In early February 2026, Glencore threatened to close the smelter.
