= Lomas Bayas =

Copper mine in Chile

- Location within Antofagasta Region Location within Chile
- Location: Sierra Gorda, Antofagasta Region, Chile; 23°25′49.83″S 69°30′35.88″W
- Products: Copper
- Production: 65,800 tonnes copper cathode
- Financial year: 2023
- Opened: 1998
- Company: Glencore

Lomas Bayas is an open pit copper mine located in the Atacama Desert of northern Chile. It lies in the inland commune of Sierra Gorda in Antofagasta Region. It lies about 90 km east of the port city of Antofagasta. In 2023, it operated with 1,109 own workers and 3,129 contractors. The mine began as a project of Westmin Resources, changing ownership multiple times – first to Boliden AB, then to Falconbridge Limited in 2001. When Xstrata plc acquired Falconbridge Limited in 2006, the mine ownership passed this company; then in 2013, Xstrata was bought by Glencore.

The mine is operated by Compañía Minera Lomas Bayas S.A. which is fully owned by Glencore.

Commercial operations in the mine started in mid-1998. The grade of the ores extracted and processed at Lomas Bayas is low (0.27% copper in the 2010s) when compared to the average grade of copper ores extracted in other Chilean mines.

In late September 2025, the mine suffered a major fire. By October 1, it was extinguished and no deaths were reported.
