= O. vulgaris =

O. vulgaris may refer to:

- Octopus vulgaris, the common octopus, the most studied of all octopus species
- Opuntia vulgaris, a synonym for Opuntia ficus-indica, the Indian fig opuntia or barbary fig, a cactus species and a long-domesticated crop plant

== See also ==
- Vulgaris (disambiguation)
