= TNI =

TNI or Tni may refer to:

- Satna Airport, IATA code TNI
- Tahitian Noni International, Inc.
- Taqramiut Nipingat Inc., an Inuit broadcasting organization in Quebec, Canada
- Telephone Network Interface; see Network interface device (NID)
- Indonesian National Armed Forces (Tentara Nasional Indonesia)
- Texas Neurosciences Institute, a research and neurological clinical center
- Thai-Nichi Institute of Technology a private college in Thailand
- Transnationality Index
- Transnational Institute
- The National Interest
- The New Inquiry
- Trichoplusia ni, the cabbage looper moth
- Trusted News Initiative
