= Bulgar =

Bulgar may refer to:

- Bulgars, a historical Turkic group
- Oghur languages
  - Bulgar language, spoken C7–C14

Bulgar may also refer to:

- Bolghar, the capital city of Volga Bulgaria
- Bulgur, a wheat product
- Bulgar, an Ashkenazi Jewish dance form used in Klezmer music
- Bulgar, Chekmagushevsky District, Republic of Bashkortostan
- Bulgar Mosque

== See also ==
- Bulgarian (disambiguation)
- Bolgar (disambiguation)
- Vulgar (disambiguation)
- Volgar (disambiguation)
- Balgar, a Bulgarian animated web series
- Old Great Bulgaria
- Danube Bulgaria
- Volga Bulgaria
