= Bulgarian =

Bulgarian may refer to:

- Something of, from, or related to the modern Bulgaria
- Something of, from, or related to the Medieval Bulgaria
- Something of, from, or related to the Byzantine province called Bulgaria
- Bulgarians, a South Slavic ethnic group
- Bulgarian language, a Slavic language
- Bulgarian alphabet
- Bulgarian citizen
- Bulgarian culture
- Bulgarian cuisine, a representative of the cuisine of Southeastern Europe

== See also ==
- List of Bulgarians
- Bulgarian name, names of Bulgarians
- Bulgarian umbrella, an umbrella with a hidden pneumatic mechanism
- Bulgar (disambiguation)
- Bulgarian-Serbian War (disambiguation)
