= Vulgar =

Vulgar is a Latin word meaning "common" or "pertaining to ordinary people."

== Language ==
- Vulgar or common language, the vernacular speech of a region or a people
- Language use characterised by vulgarity, see Vulgarism and Vulgarity § Language

== Other uses ==
- A vulgar fraction in mathematics, one written in the common way and not as a decimal fraction
- Vulgar (film), a 2000 American film
- Vulgar (album), a 2003 album by Japanese band Dir en grey
- "Vulgar" (song), a 2023 song by Sam Smith and Madonna

== See also ==
- Vulgate (disambiguation)
- Vulgaris (disambiguation)
- Vulgaria, a 2012 film
- Volgar (disambiguation)
- Bulgar (disambiguation)
- Bolgar (disambiguation)
