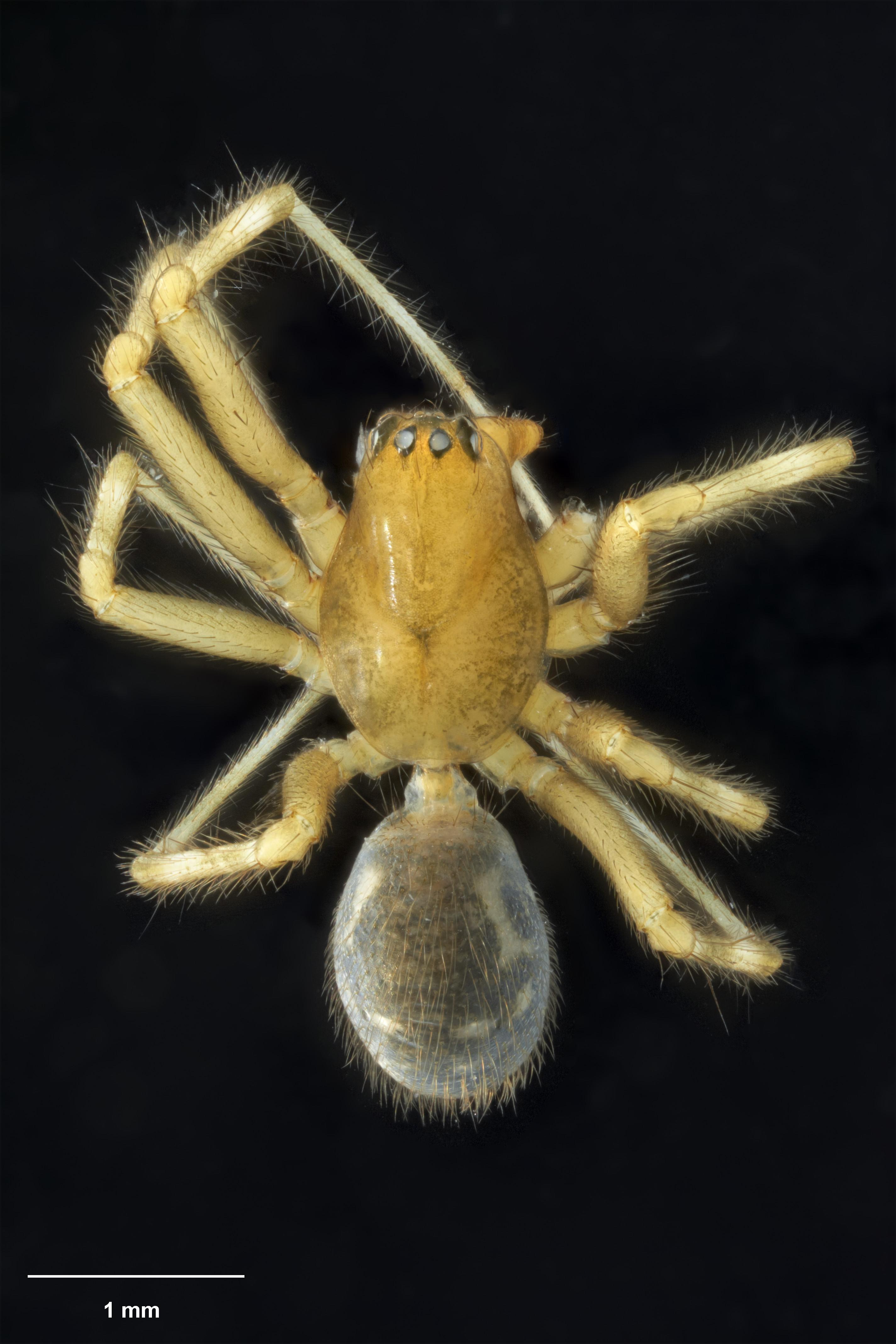

Conservation status
- Data Deficient (NZ TCS)

Scientific classification
- Domain: Eukaryota
- Kingdom: Animalia
- Phylum: Arthropoda
- Subphylum: Chelicerata
- Class: Arachnida
- Order: Araneae
- Infraorder: Araneomorphae
- Family: Linyphiidae
- Genus: Novafroneta
- Species: N. nova

Binomial name
- Novafroneta nova Blest & Vink, 2003

= Novafroneta nova =

Species of spider

Novafroneta nova is a species of sheet weaver spider endemic to New Zealand.

== Taxonomy ==
This species was described in 2003 by A.D Blest and Cor Vink from a male specimen. The holotype is stored in Te Papa Museum under registration number AS.000476.

== Description ==
The male is recorded at 3.10mm in length. This species has a dark brown prosoma, greyish brown legs and a black abdomen that has pale markings.

== Distribution ==
This species is only known from Nelson, New Zealand.

== Conservation status ==
Under the New Zealand Threat Classification System, this species is listed as "Data Deficient" with the qualifiers of "Data Poor: Size", "Data Poor: Trend" and "One Location".
