= Scylaceus pallidus =

Scientific classification
- Domain: Eukaryota
- Kingdom: Animalia
- Phylum: Arthropoda
- Subphylum: Chelicerata
- Class: Arachnida
- Order: Araneae
- Infraorder: Araneomorphae
- Family: Linyphiidae
- Genus: Scylaceus
- Species: S. pallidus

Binomial name
- Scylaceus pallidus (Emerton, 1882)

Species of spider

Scylaceus pallidus is a species of dwarf spider in the family Linyphiidae. It is found in the United States and Canada.
