= Walckenaeria subdirecta =

Scientific classification
- Domain: Eukaryota
- Kingdom: Animalia
- Phylum: Arthropoda
- Subphylum: Chelicerata
- Class: Arachnida
- Order: Araneae
- Infraorder: Araneomorphae
- Family: Linyphiidae
- Genus: Walckenaeria
- Species: W. subdirecta

Binomial name
- Walckenaeria subdirecta Millidge, 1983

Species of spider

Walckenaeria subdirecta is a species of dwarf spider in the family Linyphiidae. It is found in the United States and Canada.
