= Josh Greenfeld =

American writer (1928–2018)

- Born: February 27, 1928
- Died: May 11, 2018 (aged 90)
- Education: B.A. Michigan; M.A. Columbia
- Occupations: Author, screenwriter
- Children: 2, including Karl
- Writing career
- Language: English
- Notable work: Harry and Tonto (1974)

Josh Greenfeld (February 27, 1928 – May 11, 2018) was an American author and screenwriter mostly known for his screenplay for the 1974 film Harry and Tonto along with Paul Mazursky, which earned them an Academy Award nomination and its star, Art Carney, the Oscar itself for Best Actor. Greenfeld also wrote Oh, God! Book II and the TV special Lovey and was the author of several books about his autistic son, Noah Greenfeld.

== Early life and education ==
He was born in Maldon, Massachusetts; his father was in the "waste business." Growing up in Brooklyn, he attended Samuel Tilden High School. After attending Brooklyn College, he received a BA from the University of Michigan and an MA from Columbia University.

== Career ==
The trilogy, A Child Called Noah, A Place for Noah, and A Client Called Noah, details the effects that Noah's disabilities placed on the Greenfelds and the extraordinary lengths that the family went through to find the very best care available for their son. His wife, Fumiko Kometani, is a Japanese writer and has won the Akutagawa Prize, Japan's most prestigious literary award; she too wrote about their son and his developmental disability.

Among Greenfeld's plays are Clandestine on the Morning Line, I Have a Dream, The Last Two Jews of Kabul, Whoosh!, and Canal Street. His novels include O for a Master of Magic, The Return of Mr. Hollywood, and What Happened Was This.

In 1968, Greenfeld signed the "Writers and Editors War Tax Protest" pledge, vowing to refuse tax payments in protest against the Vietnam War.

== Personal ==
He met his wife, Fumiko Kometani, at an artist colony in 1959. They had two sons, Noah and Karl, who wrote Boy Alone: A Brother's Memoir.
