= Aaron Regent =

Canadian businessman (born 1966)

- Born: 5 January 1966 (age 60); Dublin, Ireland
- Education: University of Western Ontario (BA 1988)
- Occupations: Business executive, chartered accountant
- Known for: Chairman of the board of the Bank of Nova Scotia
- Spouse: Heather Marie Oshanek (m. 1993)

Aaron William Regent (born 5 January 1966) is an Irish born Canadian business executive and chartered accountant who has been chairman of the board of the Bank of Nova Scotia since 2019.

Regent began his career in 1988 with Ernst & Young, and in 1991 was hired by Brascan. Regent held executive roles with several Brascan companies including Great Lakes Power, Noranda Mines, and Falconbridge. In 1997, Brascan merged with Edper to form Brookfield, and in 2006 Regent became a senior managing partner in the firm.

Regent left Brookfield at the beginning of 2009 to become president of Barrick Gold. He remained with the company for three years, and was fired in 2012 due to the company's underperforming share price. In 2013 Regent founded Magris Resources, of which he remains the chairman. That same year he was elected a director of the Bank of Nova Scotia, and in 2019 he became the bank's chairman.

== Early life and education ==
Aaron William Regent was born in Dublin, Ireland on 5 January 1966 to Albert William Regent and Claire Elizabeth Cooper (1935–2020). The Regent family immigrated to Canada in 1967 and settled in Calgary. Aaron attended the University of Western Ontario, where he graduated Bachelor of Arts in 1988.

== Career ==
Regent began his career that year as a staff accountant with Ernst & Young. In 1991 he was hired by Brascan as a vice-president, and concurrently was made vice-president of its subsidiary company Great Lakes Power. In 1995 he became a senior vice-president of Brascan. From 1995 to 2000 he served as president of Trilon Financial Corporation, the financial services arm of Brascan. In May 2000, Regent was appointed executive vice-president and chief financial officer of Noranda, also owned by Brascan. In May 2002, Regent succeeded Derek Pannell as president of, Falconbridge, which was 57 per cent owned by Noranda. Brascan was renamed Brookfield in 2005, and from September 2006 to December 2008 Regent was a senior managing partner in the firm.

In January 2009, Regent left Brookfield and became president of Barrick Gold. He replaced Peter Munk, who had been acting president since Gregory Charles Wilkins resigned earlier in 2008 for health reasons. In June 2012, Regent was fired due to an underperforming share price. He was replaced by Jamie Sokalsky.

After his departure from Barrick, in 2013 he founded Magris Resources, a private equity company that acquires mining assets globally. Regent was elected a director of the Bank of Nova Scotia on 9 April 2013. In 2019, he was elected chairman of the board, effective 9 April, succeeding Thomas Charles O'Neill.

Regent is a vice-chairman of the C. D. Howe Institute, and hosts an event series called the Regent Debates.
