= Walckenaeria auranticeps =

Scientific classification
- Domain: Eukaryota
- Kingdom: Animalia
- Phylum: Arthropoda
- Subphylum: Chelicerata
- Class: Arachnida
- Order: Araneae
- Infraorder: Araneomorphae
- Family: Linyphiidae
- Genus: Walckenaeria
- Species: W. auranticeps

Binomial name
- Walckenaeria auranticeps (Emerton, 1882)

Species of spider

Walckenaeria auranticeps is a species of dwarf spider in the family Linyphiidae. It is found in Russia, Canada, and the United States.
