= Falconbridge Nickel Mines =

Canadian mining company (1928–2007)

- Type: Public company
- Industry: Mining
- Founded: 28 August 1928
- Defunct: 28 October 2007
- Fate: Acquired by Xstrata in 2006, renamed in 2007
- Successor: Xstrata Canada Corporation
- Headquarters: Toronto, Ontario

Falconbridge Nickel Mines Limited, and from 1982 onwards Falconbridge Limited, was a Canadian mining company that existed from 1928 to 2007. It had operations in 18 countries, and was involved in the exploration, mining, processing, and marketing of metal and mineral products, including nickel, copper, cobalt, and platinum. It was listed on the TSX (under the symbol FAL.LV) and NYSE (FAL), and had revenue of US$6.9 billion in 2005. In August 2006, it was absorbed by Swiss-based mining company Xstrata, which had formerly been a major shareholder. On 28 October 2007, Falconbridge Limited changed its name to the Xstrata Canada Corporation.

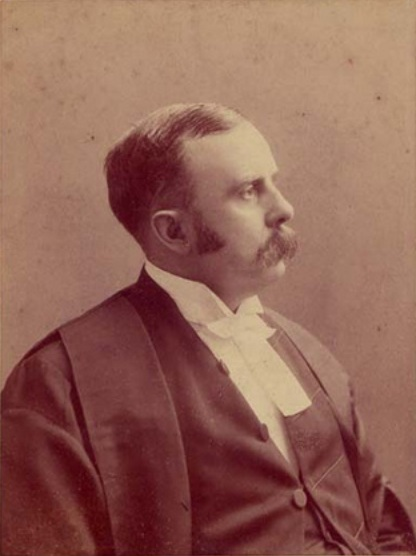
William Glenholme Falconbridge (1846–1920), namesake of the town

Falconbridge, named after the town Falconbridge, which in turn was named for a prominent "son", one Sir William Glenholme Falconbridge, High Court Judge whose father John Kennedy Falconbridge, had migrated to Ontario from Lisburn Ireland.

Falconbridge is important to the economic and commercial development of the northern region of Ontario Canada, particularly the communities in and around Sudbury.

== History ==
In 1928, an experienced prospector and businessman Thayer Lindsley purchased mining claims containing rich deposits of nickel-copper ore in the area northeast of Sudbury. These claims had been established as early as 1901, when Thomas Edison made the original discovery of the Falconbridge ore body, but remained undeveloped until Lindsley's purchase. Soon thereafter, planning and construction of a company town began, to house and service workers for the future mines. The community, complete with utilities and a medical centre, was named Falconbridge after the geographic township in which it was located. Likewise, the company became known as Falconbridge Nickel Mines Limited.

Just one year later in 1929, the new company acquired the Kristiansand Nikkelraffineringsverk A/S refinery in Kristiansand, Norway. This expanded its operations, but more importantly the company also gained the rights to the Hybinette nickel refining process.

The operations at the Falconbridge site expanded in the early 1930s. By 1930 ore from an underground mine was being extracted at 250 tonnes per day, and a nearby smelter was in operation to process the material. In 1932, a mill and sintering facility began operation.

Through the 1950s and 1960s, significant expansion of the Sudbury Basin operations took place, including some twelve new mines. All recovered nickel, copper, and smaller amounts of other materials including platinides. Meanwhile, the Nikkelverk operation began recovering cobalt alongside previous extractions in 1952, using a new refining process. In 1962, Falconbridge acquired Ventures Limited, including its numerous international operations and geological exploration infrastructure, allowing further expansion and growth outside of Canada.

In 1971 the Falconbridge Dominicana (Falcondo) mine and process plant commenced operation in Bonao, Dominican Republic. The site employed a novel reduction and smelting technique superior to the kiln process. To aid in community development, the Falcondo Foundation was established in 1989 and has been a pioneer in Natural Resource Corporate Social Responsibility.

In 1977, Falconbridge patented the chlorine leach nickel refining process that had been developed in-house.

The late 1970s saw the company play a role, alongside Inco, in the environmental reclamation efforts undertaken in the Sudbury region. As part of this, a new, more efficient smelter was opened, as well as a facility for the production of sulfuric acid. This commercially saleable chemical had been a source of significant ecological damage when it was produced in the atmosphere by the reaction of sulfur dioxide emissions. The new acid plant allowed this effect to be greatly reduced by catalyzing the reaction before emission, while producing additional revenue from the sale of the acid.

By 1984, the commercial reserves at the original Falconbridge Mine had been exhausted. Production continued at several other sites in the Sudbury area. The company expanded within northern Ontario by acquiring the Kidd Mine and Kidd Metallurgical Site (Met Site) in Timmins, Ontario. Expansion continued in the 1990s, with a new mine in Sudbury, and one at Raglan in northern Quebec, though Falconbridge lost the bidding war with Inco for the deposit at Voisey's Bay. The new century saw more acquisitions, including the Montcalm mine in Timmins, the Kabanga project in Tanzania, and the Lomas Bayas mine in Chile.

Noranda proposed a merger to Falconbridge in March 2005.

In June 2005 Falconbridge merged with Noranda, previously the 58.4% owner, continuing under the name Falconbridge Limited. Noranda brought significant variety to the business, including operations in aluminum mining and recycling of electronic hardware.

In August 2005 Brascan Limited sold its 20% share in Falconbridge to Xstrata.

== Operations as of 2006 ==
At the time of the Xstrata takeover, Falconbridge had major operations in and around the Sudbury Basin, including the Craig, Fraser, and Thayer Lindsley underground copper/nickel mines, as well as a mill (Strathcona), nickel smelter, sulfuric acid plant, and a technology centre. In 2005, Falconbridge had started the Deposit Definition phase of the Nickel Rim South mine near the Sudbury Airport.

Metal refining was no longer carried out in Sudbury by Falconbridge, but rather at its Falconbridge Nikkelverk operation in Kristiansand.

Another Canadian operation was the Kidd Mine and Kidd Metallurgical Site in Timmins, Ontario which includes an underground copper/zinc mine, concentrator, copper smelter and copper refinery, zinc plant, indium plant, cadmium plant, and sulfuric acid plants. Falconbridge also operated the Montcalm underground nickel mine west of Timmins. Other sites were located in Quebec, Ontario (Rouyn-Noranda: Horne copper smelter, Montreal: CCR copper refinery, Salaberry-de-Valleyfield: CEZ zinc refinery, Nunavik: Raglan underground nickel/copper mine and mill) and Bathurst, New Brunswick (Brunswick underground zinc/lead mine, lead smelter and lead refinery, and silver refinery).

Copper and precious metal recycling facilities were at Brampton, Ontario; East Providence, Rhode Island; La Vergne, Tennessee; Roseville, California; San Jose, California; and Penang, Malaysia.

Falconbridge Ltd. also operated an aluminium smelter in New Madrid, Missouri and an alumina refinery in Gramercy, Louisiana. The aluminum produced from these mills was prepared in one of four rolling mills located in Huntingdon, Tennessee (2 mills); Salisbury, North Carolina (1 mill); and Newport, Arkansas (1 mill).

Central American and Caribbean projects included the St. Ann bauxite mine in Discovery Bay, Jamaica and the Falcondo nickel surface mine and processing plant in Bonao, Dominican Republic.

South American properties were mainly copper deposits such as the Antamina copper/zinc open-pit mine in northern Peru, the Collahuasi copper/molybdenum open-pit mine (including mill, liquid–liquid extraction plant, and electrowinning plant) in northern Chile, the Lomas Bayas open-pit copper mine (including liquid–liquid extraction plant and electrowinning plant), and the Altonorte copper smelter also in northern Chile.

Falconbridge also owned a Boeing 737-200 (registration C-FFAL). The aircraft is based in Toronto at Pearson International Airport. The aircraft was repainted with Xstrata livery following the takeover, and still operates.

== Merger efforts and acquisition ==
In 1996, as part of a strategic initiative - growth study, internally commissioned during the struggle between INCO and Falconbridge over acquiring Voisey's Bay, a plan and proposal came forth for Falconbridge to abandon its attempt to acquire the property in Labrador and redirect its efforts and financial capacity at acquiring INCO itself. The strategic plan was presented to and declined by Falconbridge majority owners at the time, Noranda (and their majority owner - Brascan).

On 11 October 2005, Inco announced a proposal to acquire Falconbridge for $12 billion. This came at a time of especially high prices for base metals, including nickel. Part of the motivation for the merger was to avoid a takeover of either company by cash-flushed foreign competitors. Additionally, significant synergies would have been realized in the Sudbury operations in Project Pentlandite, with both companies performing the same kind of extraction and smelting work on the same kind of ore.

The two companies were set upon by hostile takeover bids from rival firms. Swiss Xstrata, already 19.9% owner of Falconbridge through its purchase of Brascan's share, bid for a complete acquisition, while Teck Cominco of Vancouver set its sights on Inco.

On 13 May 2006, Inco announced that it increased its offer to acquire Falconbridge by $5.00 CAD per share, bringing the bid to $61.04 CAD per share (based on 23 June 2006 Inco/Phelps Dodge share price).

On 26 June 2006, Phelps Dodge made a bid for the proposed combined Inco/Falconbridge company, valued at around US$40 billion. This would have formed the Phelps Dodge Inco Corp., valued at US$56 billion, creating the fifth largest mining company, largest nickel producer, and the second largest copper producer in the world with corporate and copper division headquarters located in Phoenix, Arizona and nickel division headquarters in Toronto, Ontario. The deadline for the Inco offer was 13 July 2006.

On 18 May 2006, Xstrata had announced a proposal to acquire Falconbridge for $52.50 CAD per share. This was a cash offer, unlike the Inco offer of a combination of cash and shares. On 12 July 2006, Xstrata announced that it increased its offer to acquire Falconbridge to $59.00 CAD per share (an approximate total value of $22.5 billion CAD). This counter-offer was 9.6% higher than Inco's bid. The deadline for Xstrata's bid to be complete was 21 July 2006. Xstrata acquired and absorbed Falconbridge in late August 2006, leaving Inco open to bids by Phelps Dodge and the Brazilian company CVRD. Falconbridge became Xstrata Nickel, which continued to be based in Toronto.

In August 2007 the Koniambo mine project was headed by Falconbridge Limited. CEO Aaron Regent was in talks with China Minmetals and China Development Bank about them investing in the form of debt rather than equity.

On 2 May 2013 Glencore completed the merger with Xstrata.

== Social impact in Sudbury ==
Falconbridge lent its name to a company town northeast of Sudbury which grew to be a community in its own right. The town of Falconbridge was incorporated by the provincial government in 1957. It was organized along with several other communities into the Town of Nickel Centre and Regional Municipality of Sudbury in 1973; the regional municipality was in turn amalgamated into today's city of Greater Sudbury in 2001.

Some Falconbridge workers also lived in the nearby community of Happy Valley, which was abandoned in the 1960s due to pollution from the Falconbridge smelter.

"Falco", as it was often called by Sudbury residents, remained for decades the second-largest employer in the Sudbury area, exceeded only by rival mining giant Inco. The economic fortune of the city was tied to those of the mining companies, as a strike at either company had a major effect on the livelihood of thousands of workers. The effect diminished as economic diversification progressed in the 1980s and 1990s.

Citizens, particularly workers and their families, came to develop an attachment to what were seen as local companies with significant size and influence in the mining industry. In particular, a certain degree of rivalry between workers at the two mining giants, who were members of rival labour unions, developed. In the 1950s and early 1960s, factional wars between the competing unions sometimes led to riots in the streets of Sudbury.

A proposal to merge Inco and Falconbridge in 2006 was headed with the slogan "Two proud histories, one great future", in reference to the strong identities which workers and the community had attached to the companies.

A major street in Sudbury is named Falconbridge Road, after the company and community. In 2007, Xstrata donated Falconbridge's historic Edison Building, its onetime head office, to the city of Greater Sudbury to serve as the new home of the city archives.

== Leadership ==
=== President ===
1. Thayer Lindsley, 28 August 1928 – 3 March 1936
2. James Gordon Hardy, 3 March 1936 – 15 March 1945
3. Lewis K. Brindley, 15 March 1945 – July 1947
4. Thayer Lindsley, July 1947 – 28 March 1956
5. Robert Bernard Anderson, 28 March 1956 – 20 March 1957
6. Dr Horace John Fraser, 20 March 1957 – 2 February 1969 †
7. Marsh Alexander Cooper, 6 February 1969 – 2 June 1980
8. Douglas Broward Craig, 2 June 1980 – 21 October 1980
9. Harold Townsend Berry, 21 October 1980 – 31 December 1982
10. Dr William Fleming James, 20 April 1982 – 18 September 1989
11. Alexander George Balogh, 25 September 1989– 31 December 1990
12. Franklin George Thomas Pickard, 1 January 1991 – 25 September 1996 †
13. Øyvind Hushovd, 9 December 1996 – 27 February 2002
14. Derek George Pannell, 27 February 2002 – 1 June 2002
15. Aaron William Regent, 1 June 2002 – 21 August 2006

=== Chairman of the Board ===
1. Howard Brighton Keck, 1969–1978
2. Joseph Edmondson Reid, 1978–1981
3. Harold Townsend Berry, 14 September 1981– 31 December 1982
4. Dr William Fleming James, 1 January 1983 – 18 September 1989
5. Alexander George Balogh, 1994– 23 April 2003
6. David Wylie Kerr, 23 April 2003 – 17 August 2006

† = died in office
