= Walckenaeria vilbasteae =

Scientific classification
- Kingdom: Animalia
- Phylum: Arthropoda
- Subphylum: Chelicerata
- Class: Arachnida
- Order: Araneae
- Infraorder: Araneomorphae
- Family: Linyphiidae
- Genus: Walckenaeria
- Species: W. vilbasteae

Binomial name
- Walckenaeria vilbasteae Wunderlich, 1980

Species of spider

Walckenaeria vilbasteae is a spider species found in Estonia.
