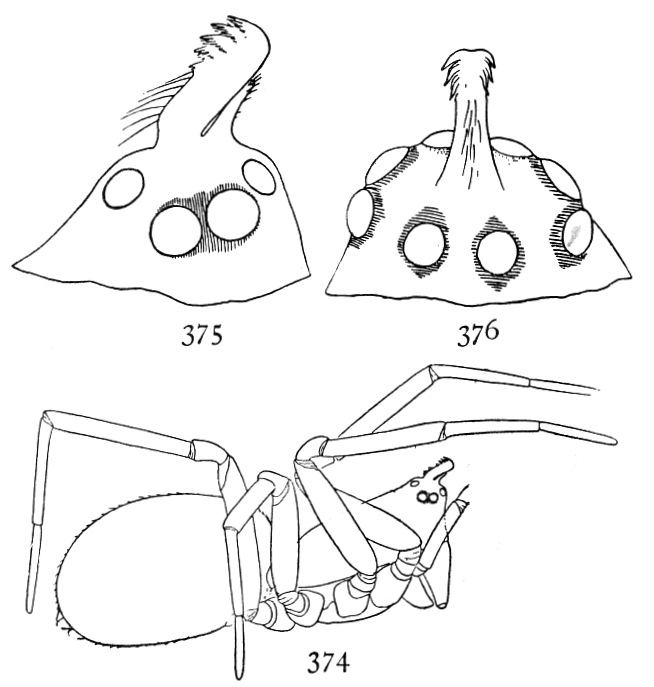
- Walckenaeria directa (=Cornicularia directa).—374, male enlarged sixteen times. 375, head of male showing the double horn. 376, head of male from above

Scientific classification
- Domain: Eukaryota
- Kingdom: Animalia
- Phylum: Arthropoda
- Subphylum: Chelicerata
- Class: Arachnida
- Order: Araneae
- Infraorder: Araneomorphae
- Family: Linyphiidae
- Genus: Walckenaeria
- Species: W. directa

Binomial name
- Walckenaeria directa (O. P.-Cambridge, 1874)

= Walckenaeria directa =

Species of spider

Walckenaeria directa is a species of dwarf spider in the family Linyphiidae. It is found in the US and Canada.
