= Walckenaeria castanea =

Scientific classification
- Domain: Eukaryota
- Kingdom: Animalia
- Phylum: Arthropoda
- Subphylum: Chelicerata
- Class: Arachnida
- Order: Araneae
- Infraorder: Araneomorphae
- Family: Linyphiidae
- Genus: Walckenaeria
- Species: W. castanea

Binomial name
- Walckenaeria castanea (Emerton, 1882)

Species of spider

Walckenaeria castanea is a species of dwarf spider in the family Linyphiidae. It is found in the United States, Canada, and Greenland.
