= Bulgaru =

Bulgaru and Bulgariu are Romanian ethnonymic surnames originated from the nickname bulgarul, "Bulgarian". in 2013, 1,333 persons had the surname Bulgaru in Romania. Notable people with the surname include:

- Aurel Bulgariu, Romanian handball player
- Bob Bulgaru, born Gheorghe Bulgaru (1907–1939), Romanian painter and graphic designer
- Miriam Bulgaru, Romanian female tennis player
- Simeon Bulgaru, Moldovan football manager and former player

== See also ==
- Bolgar (surname)
