= Volgar =

Volgar may refer to:

- Volgars, extinct people of Central Asia
- Volgar language, the extinct language of the Bulgars
- Volgar languages
- FC Volgar Astrakhan - Russian football club

== See also ==
- Vulgar (disambiguation)
- Bolgar (disambiguation)
- Bulgar (disambiguation)
