= Walckenaeria digitata =

Scientific classification
- Domain: Eukaryota
- Kingdom: Animalia
- Phylum: Arthropoda
- Subphylum: Chelicerata
- Class: Arachnida
- Order: Araneae
- Infraorder: Araneomorphae
- Family: Linyphiidae
- Genus: Walckenaeria
- Species: W. digitata

Binomial name
- Walckenaeria digitata (Emerton, 1913)

Species of spider

Walckenaeria digitata is a species of dwarf spider in the family Linyphiidae. It is found in the United States and Canada.

== Description ==
Walckenaeria digitata was first described by Emerton in 1913. As a member of the family Linyphiidae, it is classified as a dwarf spider. These spiders are characterized by their small size and intricate web-building behaviors.

== Distribution ==
This species is native to the United States and Canada. Individuals of Walckenaeria digitata can be found in specific regions of these countries, showcasing a localized distribution pattern.
