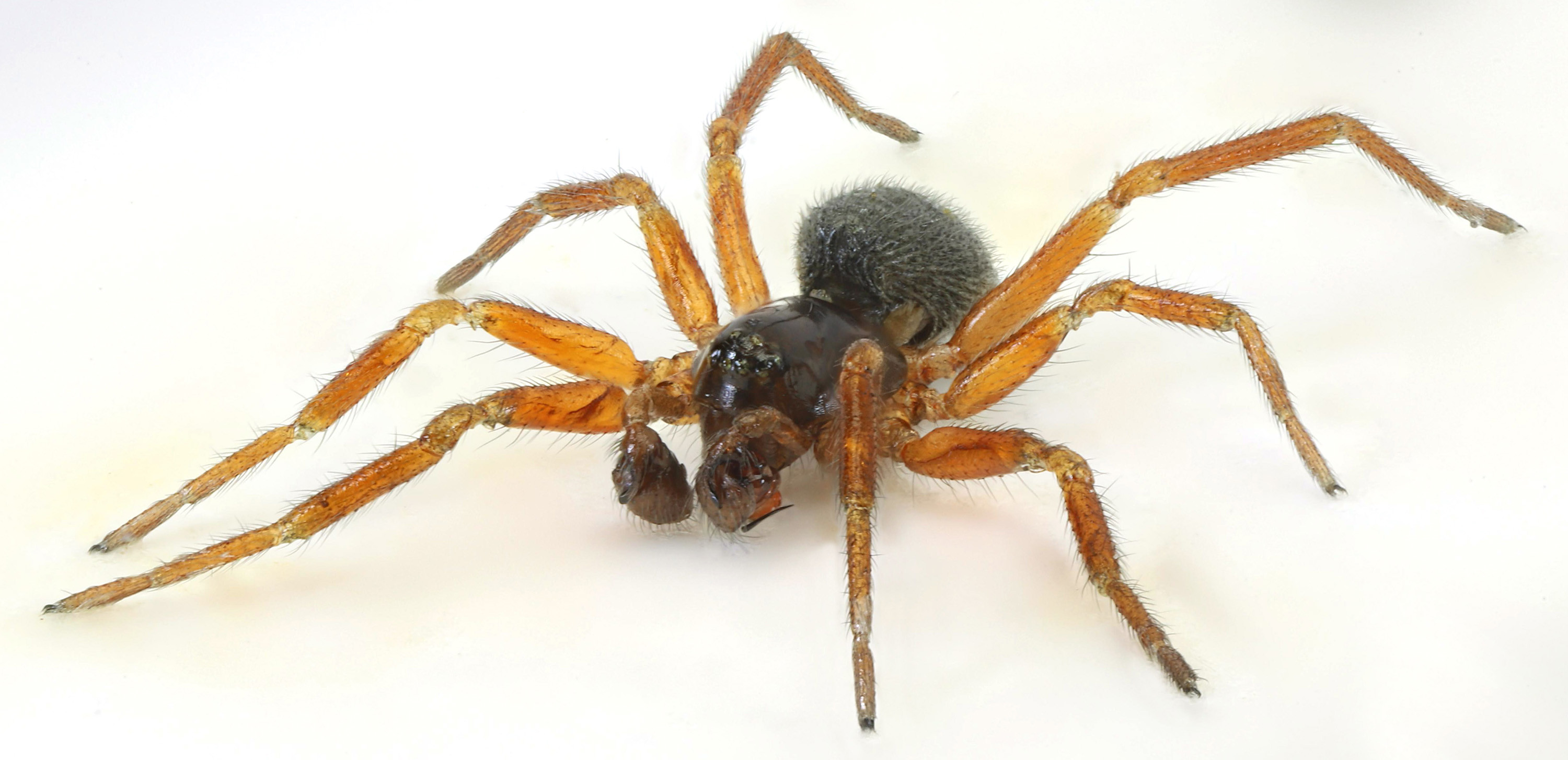

Scientific classification
- Kingdom: Animalia
- Phylum: Arthropoda
- Subphylum: Chelicerata
- Class: Arachnida
- Order: Araneae
- Infraorder: Araneomorphae
- Family: Linyphiidae
- Genus: Walckenaeria
- Species: W. vigilax

Binomial name
- Walckenaeria vigilax (Blackwall, 1853)

= Walckenaeria vigilax =

Species of spider

Walckenaeria vigilax is a spider species with Holarctic distribution. It is considered new to the fauna of Latvia since 2009.
