= Okhotigone =

Scientific classification
- Kingdom: Animalia
- Phylum: Arthropoda
- Subphylum: Chelicerata
- Class: Arachnida
- Order: Araneae
- Infraorder: Araneomorphae
- Family: Linyphiidae
- Genus: Okhotigone; Eskov, 1993
- Species: O. sounkyoensis

Binomial name
- Okhotigone sounkyoensis (Saito, 1986)

Synonyms
- Walckenaeria sounkyoensis Saito, 1986

Genus of spiders

Okhotigone is a genus of spiders in the family Linyphiidae. The genus contains one species, Okhotigone sounkyoensis, found in Russia, China and Japan.

It was originally described in 1986 as Walckenaeria sounkyoensis but moved to the new genus Okhotigone in 1993.
