= Novafroneta parmulata =

Conservation status
- Data Deficient (NZ TCS)

Scientific classification
- Domain: Eukaryota
- Kingdom: Animalia
- Phylum: Arthropoda
- Subphylum: Chelicerata
- Class: Arachnida
- Order: Araneae
- Infraorder: Araneomorphae
- Family: Linyphiidae
- Genus: Novafroneta
- Species: N. parmulata

Binomial name
- Novafroneta parmulata Blest, 1979

Species of spider

Novafroneta parmulata is a species of sheet weaver spider endemic to New Zealand.

== Taxonomy ==
This species was described in 1979 by A.D Blest from female specimens. The holotype is stored in Otago Museum.

== Description ==
The female is recorded at 3.32mm in length. This species has a brown cephalothorax and legs. The abdomen is grey with pale markings.

== Distribution ==
This species is only known from the Taranaki and Nelson regions of New Zealand.

== Conservation status ==
Under the New Zealand Threat Classification System, this species is listed as "Data Deficient" with the qualifiers of "Data Poor: Size", "Data Poor: Trend" and "One Location".
