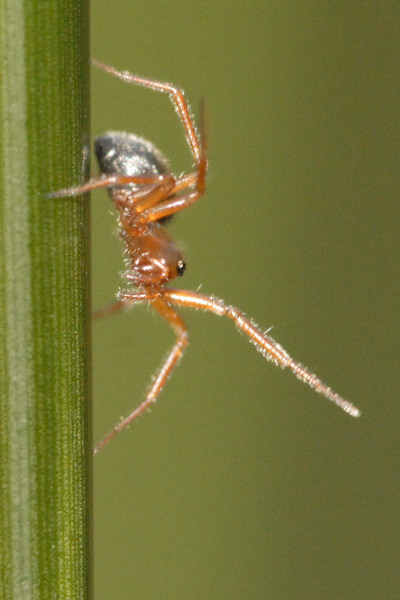
- Walckenaeria acuminata from Commanster, Belgian High Ardennes.

Scientific classification
- Kingdom: Animalia
- Phylum: Arthropoda
- Subphylum: Chelicerata
- Class: Arachnida
- Order: Araneae
- Infraorder: Araneomorphae
- Family: Linyphiidae
- Genus: Walckenaeria
- Species: W. acuminata

Binomial name
- Walckenaeria acuminata Blackwall, 1833

= Walckenaeria acuminata =

Species of spider

Walckenaeria acuminata is a spider species found in Europe and the Caucasus.
