= Communism (disambiguation) =

Communism is a political ideology and movement with the ultimate aim of achieving a communist society.

Communism may also refer to:

- Communism Peak, a mountain in Tajikistan
- Communist society, a hypothetical socioeconomic system
- Communist state, a term for a state with dominant communist ideology

== See also ==
- Marxism–Leninism, a communist ideology that combines elements of Marxism with Leninism
- Kommunist, Soviet magazine
- Kommunizm, a village in Tajikistan
- Kommunizm (band), a Russian avant-garde music group
