= Bolgary, Vladimir Oblast =

Bolgary Болгары
- Village
- Location within Vladimir Oblast Location within Russia
- Coordinates: 56°00′N 40°07′E
- Country: Russia
- Region: Vladimir Oblast
- District: Sobinsky District
- Time zone: UTC+3:00

Bolgary (Russian: Болгары) is a rural locality (a village) in Aserkhovskoye Rural Settlement, Sobinsky District, Vladimir Oblast, Russia. The population was 7 as of 2010.

== Geography ==
Bolgary is located on the Klyazma River, 8 km east of Sobinka (the district's administrative centre) by road. Arbuzovo is the nearest rural locality.
