= Scylaceus =

Scientific classification
- Kingdom: Animalia
- Phylum: Arthropoda
- Subphylum: Chelicerata
- Class: Arachnida
- Order: Araneae
- Infraorder: Araneomorphae
- Family: Linyphiidae
- Genus: Scylaceus; Bishop & Crosby, 1938

Type species
- S. pallidus (Emerton, 1882)

Species
- S. pallidus (Emerton, 1882) – USA, Canada; S. selma (Chamberlin, 1949) – USA

Genus of spiders

Scylaceus is a genus of North American sheet weavers that was first described by S. C. Bishop & C. R. Crosby in 1938. As of May 2019 it contains only two species, both found in Canada and the United States: S. pallidus and S. selma.
