= Dactylopisthes =

Scientific classification
- Kingdom: Animalia
- Phylum: Arthropoda
- Subphylum: Chelicerata
- Class: Arachnida
- Order: Araneae
- Infraorder: Araneomorphae
- Family: Linyphiidae
- Genus: Dactylopisthes; Simon, 1884

Type species
- D. digiticeps (Simon, 1881)

Species
- 10, see text

Synonyms
- Scytiella Georgescu, 1976

Genus of spiders

Dactylopisthes is a genus of dwarf spiders that was first described by Eugène Louis Simon in 1884.

== Species ==
As of May 2019 it contains ten species:

- Dactylopisthes digiticeps (Simon, 1881) (type) – France, Austria, south-eastern Europe, Turkey, Ukraine, Russia (Europe), Israel, Iran, Afghanistan
- Dactylopisthes diphyus (Heimer, 1987) – Russia (South Siberia), Mongolia, China
- Dactylopisthes dongnai Tanasevitch, 2018 – Vietnam
- Dactylopisthes khatipara Tanasevitch, 2017 – Russia (Caucasus)
- Dactylopisthes locketi (Tanasevitch, 1983) – Central Asia
- Dactylopisthes marginalis Tanasevitch, 2018 – Thailand
- Dactylopisthes mirabilis (Tanasevitch, 1985) – Kyrgyzstan
- Dactylopisthes mirificus (Georgescu, 1976) – Romania, Ukraine, Russia (Europe, Urals), Kazakhstan
- Dactylopisthes separatus Zhao & Li, 2014 – China
- Dactylopisthes video (Chamberlin & Ivie, 1947) – Russia (Europe to Far East), Mongolia, USA (Alaska), Canada
