= Transnationality Index =

Means of ranking multinational corporations

As of 2008, the world's top 10 non-financial multinational corporations by Transnationality Index
Company	Home	Industry	%
Xstrata	(United Kingdom)	Mining & quarrying	93.2
ABB Group	(Switzerland) (Sweden)	Engineering services	90.4
Nokia	(Finland)	Electrical & electronic equip	90.3
Pernod Ricard	(France)	Food, beverages and tobacco	89.1
WPP Group	(United Kingdom)	Business services	88.9
Vodafone	(United Kingdom)	Telecommunications	88.6
Linde	(Germany)	Chemicals	88.3
AB InBev	(Belgium)	Food, beverages and tobacco	87.9
Anglo American	(United Kingdom)	Mining & quarrying	87.5
ArcelorMittal	(Luxembourg)	Metal and metal products	87.2

The Transnationality Index (TNI) is a means of ranking multinational corporations that is employed by economists and politicians.

It is calculated as the arithmetic mean of the following three ratios (where "foreign" means outside of the corporation's home country):

- the ratio of foreign assets to total assets
- the ratio of foreign sales to total sales
- the ratio of foreign employment to total employment

== History ==
The Transnationality Index was developed by the United Nations Conference on Trade and Development.

== Differences with other measures ==
Multinational corporations are also ranked by the amount of foreign assets that they own. However, the TNI ranking can differ markedly from this.

For example, as of 2000, General Electric was the second largest multinational corporation in terms of foreign asset ownership. However, it ranked only 73rd in the overall TNI, with an index score of 40%. Although the company had large investments outside of the United States, most of its sales, employment, and assets were within the United States.

In contrast, Exxon has a TNI of 68% and Vodafone has a TNI of 81%. As of 2001, General Electric ranked 75th, with a TNI of 36.7%. The 14 most transnational corporations originated in small countries (Switzerland, the United Kingdom, The Netherlands, Belgium, and Canada), whereas the largest multinational corporations in terms of foreign asset ownership all had low TNI scores. General Motors, the fourth largest multinational corporation in terms of foreign asset ownership only ranked 83rd (30.7%) in the TNI top 100. IBM ranked 50th (53.7%), Volkswagen ranked 45th (55.7%), and Toyota, the sixth largest multinational corporation in terms of foreign asset ownership, only ranked 82nd (30.9%) on the broader TNI scale.

== Globalism ==
Peter Dicken, an honorary fellow of the School of Environment and Development at the University of Manchester, argues that TNI data refute the assertions of hyperglobalism. The data, he argues, prove false the claim that multinational corporations are "inexorably, and inevitably, abandoning their ties to their country of origin". If that were the case, we would expect the largest multinational corporations to have the majority of their assets, sales, and employment outside of their countries of origin, and thus the majority of those corporations to have high TNIs.

In fact, in the UNCTAD TNI data for the top 100 multinational corporations for 2001, the mean TNI is 52.6%, 57 of the 100 have a TNI greater than 50%, and only a mere 16 have a TNI greater than 75%. Thus, he concludes, measured TNI data provide little evidence for multinational corporations having the proportions of their assets, sales, and employees outside of their home countries that one would expect for truly global firms.

== See also ==
- Globalization
