= Shaanxinus =

Scientific classification
- Kingdom: Animalia
- Phylum: Arthropoda
- Subphylum: Chelicerata
- Class: Arachnida
- Order: Araneae
- Infraorder: Araneomorphae
- Family: Linyphiidae
- Genus: Shaanxinus; Tanasevitch, 2006

Type species
- S. rufus Tanasevitch, 2006

Species
- 16, see text

Genus of spiders

Shaanxinus is a genus of Asian sheet weavers that was first described by A. V. Tanasevitch in 2006.

== Species ==
As of November 2026 it contains twenty-six species, found in Vietnam, Taiwan, Russia, and China:

- Shaanxinus anguilliformis Xia, Zhang, Gao, Fei & Kim, 2001 – China
- Shaanxinus atayal Lin, 2019 – Taiwan
- Shaanxinus baitanhe Irfan, Rehman, Wang & Zhang, 2026 — China
- Shaanxinus curviductus Lin, 2019 – Taiwan
- Shaanxinus griseolineatus Schenkel, 1936 – China, Russia
- Shaanxinus hehuanensis Lin, 2019 – Taiwan
- Shaanxinus hirticephalus Lin, 2019 – Taiwan
- Shaanxinus insectus Irfan, Zhang & Peng, 2025 — China
- Shaanxinus kuankuoshi Irfan, Rehman, Wang & Zhang, 2026 — China
- Shaanxinus liangdang Irfan, Rehman, Wang & Zhang, 2026 — China
- Shaanxinus lixiangae Lin, 2019 – Taiwan
- Shaanxinus longiembolus Irfan, Zhang & Peng, 2025 — China
- Shaanxinus magniclypeus Lin, 2019 – Taiwan
- Shaanxinus makauyensis Lin, 2019 – Taiwan
- Shaanxinus meifengensis Lin, 2019 – Taiwan
- Shaanxinus micangshan Irfan, Rehman, Wang & Zhang, 2026 — China
- Shaanxinus mingchihensis Lin, 2019 – Taiwan
- Shaanxinus ovatus Irfan, Zhang & Peng, 2025 — China
- Shaanxinus rufus Tanasevitch, 2006 (type) – China
- Shaanxinus seediq Lin, 2019 – Taiwan
- Shaanxinus shihchoensis Lin, 2019 – Taiwan
- Shaanxinus shizhuziensis Irfan, Wang & Zhang, 2023 – China
- Shaanxinus shoukaensis Lin, 2019 – Taiwan
- Shaanxinus tamdaoensis Lin, 2019 – Vietnam
- Shaanxinus tsou Lin, 2019 – Taiwan
- Shaanxinus zhongzhai Irfan, Rehman, Wang & Zhang, 2026 — China
