= Ainerigone =

Scientific classification
- Kingdom: Animalia
- Phylum: Arthropoda
- Subphylum: Chelicerata
- Class: Arachnida
- Order: Araneae
- Infraorder: Araneomorphae
- Family: Linyphiidae
- Genus: Ainerigone; Eskov, 1993
- Species: A. saitoi

Binomial name
- Ainerigone saitoi (Ono, 1991)

Genus of spiders

Ainerigone is a monotypic genus of Asian dwarf spiders containing the single species, Ainerigone saitoi. It was first described by K. Y. Eskov in 1993, and has only been found in Japan, and in Russia.
