= Bolgar (inhabited locality) =

Bolgar (Russian: Болгар) is the name of several inhabited localities in the Republic of Tatarstan, Russia.

Urban localities

- Bolgar, Spassky District, Republic of Tatarstan, a town in Spassky District, 54°57′N 49°04′E

Rural localities

- Bolgar, Nizhnekamsky District, Republic of Tatarstan, a selo in Nizhnekamsky District, 55°24′45″N 51°36′24″E
