= Baryphymula =

Scientific classification
- Kingdom: Animalia
- Phylum: Arthropoda
- Subphylum: Chelicerata
- Class: Arachnida
- Order: Araneae
- Infraorder: Araneomorphae
- Family: Linyphiidae
- Genus: Baryphymula; Eskov, 1992
- Species: B. kamakuraensis

Binomial name
- Baryphymula kamakuraensis (Oi, 1960)

Genus of spiders

Baryphymula is a monotypic genus of Asian dwarf spiders containing the single species, Baryphymula kamakuraensis. It was first described by K. Y. Eskov in 1992, and has only been found in Japan.
