= Bulgar, Chekmagushevsky District, Republic of Bashkortostan =

Bulgar Булгар
- Village
- Location within Bashkortostan Location within Russia
- Coordinates: 55°08′N 54°46′E
- Country: Russia
- Region: Bashkortostan
- District: Chekmagushevsky District
- Time zone: UTC+5:00

Bulgar (Russian: Булгар; Bashkir: Болғар, Bolğar) is a rural locality (a village) in Chekmagushevsky District, Bashkortostan, Russia. The population was 46 as of 2010. There is 1 street.

== Geography ==
Bulgar is located 16 km east of Chekmagush (the district's administrative centre) by road. Starokalmashevo is the nearest rural locality.
