= Dániel Bolgár =

Hungarian marimbist

Dániel Bolgár (born 1982 in Budapest) is a Hungarian marimbist, percussionist, and audio mastering engineer.

Dániel Bolgár is the first marimbist, percussionist in Hungary having a marimba postgraduate diploma/degree. Dániel finished his studies in 2012 at the Royal College of Music in London, gaining a Master of Performance degree in both Advanced Solo Marimba and Percussion. Besides London, he was fortunate enough to have studied in New Jersey (United States), Budapest (Hungary), Vienna (Austria), Linz (Austria), and in Antwerp (Belgium). During his student years Dániel had the opportunity to take part in many festivals and competitions (1st Prize, Weiner Conservatory Competition, Hungary) throughout Europe and perform in several recitals and concerts as soloist and chamber musician. Although Dániel’s main focus is Western Classical music, he has also tried himself in many other genres, playing percussion and drums in rock/pop, hybrid jazz/world music formations. Besides music, Dániel also studied political science and communication at McDaniel College Budapest where he obtained his BA degree. Dániel is especially proud and privileged to have played at the Cadogan Hall (Rising Stars Programme) and at the Royal Albert Hall in London. Dániel today play with his chamber formations Duo Modarp and occasionally, Premier Players.

In Antwerp, Dániel also studied studio engineering and since 2019 he is active as mastering engineer in his studio in Budapest www.dbmastering.eu.
