= Bolgary, Permsky District, Perm Krai =

Bolgary Болгары
- Village
- Location within Perm Krai Location within Russia
- Coordinates: 57°51′N 55°50′E
- Country: Russia
- Region: Perm Krai
- District: Permsky District
- Time zone: UTC+5:00

Bolgary (Russian: Болгары) is a rural locality (a village) in Kultayevskoye Rural Settlement, Permsky District, Perm Krai, Russia. The population was 159 as of 2010. There are 22 streets.

== Geography ==
Bolgary is located 31 km southwest of Perm (the district's administrative centre) by road. Protasy is the nearest rural locality.
