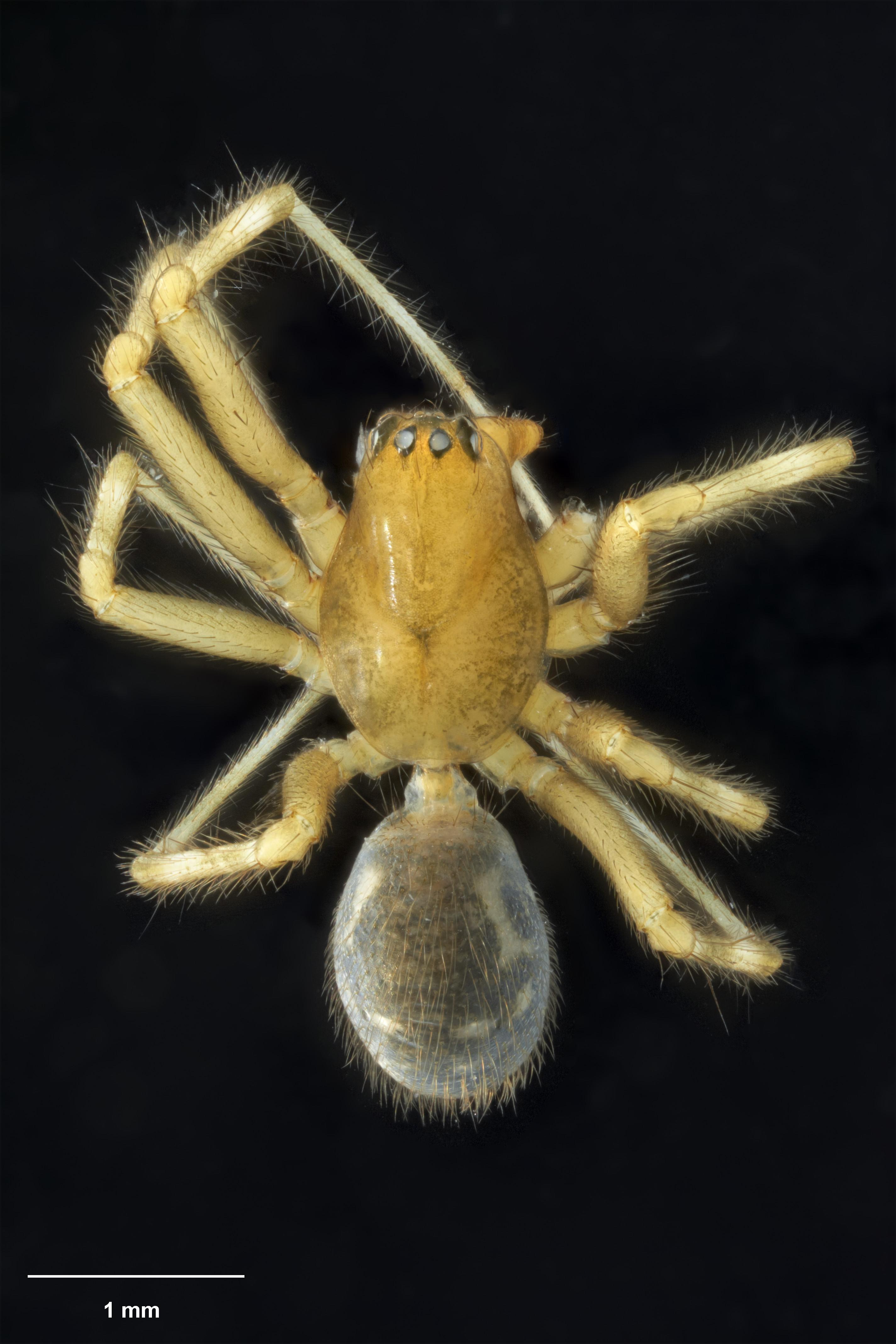
- Novafroneta nova

Scientific classification
- Kingdom: Animalia
- Phylum: Arthropoda
- Subphylum: Chelicerata
- Class: Arachnida
- Order: Araneae
- Infraorder: Araneomorphae
- Family: Linyphiidae
- Genus: Novafroneta; Blest, 1979

Type species
- N. vulgaris Blest, 1979

Species
- 6, see text

= Novafroneta =

Genus of spiders

Novafroneta is a genus of South Pacific dwarf spiders that was first described by A. D. Blest in 1979.

== Species ==
As of May 2019 it contains six species, found in New Zealand:

- Novafroneta annulipes Blest, 1979 – New Zealand
- Novafroneta gladiatrix Blest, 1979 – New Zealand
- Novafroneta nova Blest & Vink, 2003 – New Zealand
- Novafroneta parmulata Blest, 1979 – New Zealand
- Novafroneta truncata Blest & Vink, 2003 – New Zealand
- Novafroneta vulgaris Blest, 1979 (type) – New Zealand
