= Balgar (web series) =

Bulgarian satirical/parody animated series

Balgar (Bulgarian: Българ, IPA: [bɐɫˈɡar]) is a Bulgarian satirical/parody animated web series created by Nedelcho Bogdanov and set in the town of Nessebar, Bulgaria. A special guest actor in the first season was the Bulgarian radio and TV host Niki Kanchev. The series was initially offered to a number of Bulgarian TV stations, but its premiere eventually took place online.

The pilot episode was created in 2008, with the last episode of the first season completed in January 2010. The second season began in October 2011, and the third started in January 2013. The first three seasons had more than five million views on the Internet.

In an interview from February 2014 Bogdanov said that his team had begun work on developing a feature film. In November that year Balgar: The Movie was premiered as the first Bulgarian full-length animated 3D film. The fourth season of the web series began in early 2015, immediately following the movie.
