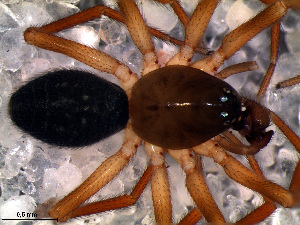

Scientific classification
- Domain: Eukaryota
- Kingdom: Animalia
- Phylum: Arthropoda
- Subphylum: Chelicerata
- Class: Arachnida
- Order: Araneae
- Infraorder: Araneomorphae
- Family: Linyphiidae
- Genus: Walckenaeria
- Species: W. crocea

Binomial name
- Walckenaeria crocea (Millidge, 1983)

= Walckenaeria crocea =

Species of spider

Walckenaeria crocea is a spider species first described by A. F. Millidge in 1983. The male holotype Millidge used was found 15 miles west of Ciudad Hidalgo in Tepetates Pass, Michoacán, Mexico.
