= Neomaso =

Scientific classification
- Kingdom: Animalia
- Phylum: Arthropoda
- Subphylum: Chelicerata
- Class: Arachnida
- Order: Araneae
- Infraorder: Araneomorphae
- Family: Linyphiidae
- Genus: Neomaso; Forster, 1970

Type species
- N. claggi Forster, 1970

Species
- 22, see text

Genus of spiders

Neomaso is a genus of dwarf spiders that was first described by Raymond Robert Forster in 1970.

== Species ==
As of May 2021 it contains twenty-two species:

- Neomaso abnormis Millidge, 1991 – Chile
- Neomaso aequabilis Millidge, 1991 – Argentina
- Neomaso angusticeps Millidge, 1985 – Chile
- Neomaso antarcticus (Hickman, 1939) – Kerguelen, Marion Is.
- Neomaso articeps Millidge, 1991 – Chile
- Neomaso arundicola Millidge, 1991 – Brazil
- Neomaso bilobatus (Tullgren, 1901) – Chile
- Neomaso claggi Forster, 1970 (type) – Chile, South Georgia
- Neomaso damocles Miller, 2007 – Brazil, Argentina
- Neomaso defoei (F. O. Pickard-Cambridge, 1899) – Chile (Juan Fernandez Is.)
- Neomaso fagicola Millidge, 1985 – Chile
- Neomaso fluminensis Millidge, 1991 – Chile
- Neomaso insperatus Millidge, 1991 – Argentina
- Neomaso insulanus Millidge, 1991 – Chile (Juan Fernandez Is.)
- Neomaso minimus Millidge, 1985 – Chile
- Neomaso parvus Millidge, 1985 – Chile
- Neomaso patagonicus (Tullgren, 1901) – Chile, Argentina
- Neomaso peltatus Millidge, 1985 – Chile
- Neomaso pollicatus (Tullgren, 1901) – Chile, Argentina, Falkland Is.
- Neomaso scutatus Millidge, 1985 – Chile
- Neomaso setiger Millidge, 1991 – Chile
- Neomaso vicinus Millidge, 1991 – Argentina
