= Bulga Coal =

Bulga Coal Pty Limited
- Company type: Joint Venture
- Industry: Mining
- Founded: 1982
- Headquarters: Singleton, Australia
- Key people: Geoff Kelly, Operations Manager
- Products: Coal
- Revenue: $1.3 Billion AUD (2011)
- Operating income: $349 million AUD (2011)
- Net income: $119.3 million AUD (2011)
- Number of employees: 1151
- Parent: Oakbridge, Nippon Oil
- Website: www.bulgacoal.com.au

Bulga Coal Pty Limited is a coal-mining company based in Singleton, New South Wales, Australia. The company operates two mines Bulga Surface Operations and Beltana Longwall Mining which form the Bulga Coal Complex. The company is a joint venture between Oakbridge Pty Ltd and Nippon Oil Australia Pty Ltd. Bulga Coal currently produces approx 16 million tonnes of coal per year

== Company Ownership ==
Bulga Coal is a joint venture between Oakbridge Pty Limited and Nippon Oil Australia Pty Limited.

Oakbridge Pty Ltd, previously an Australia Public Company listed on the ASX, is currently majority owned by global mining giant Glencore (through its subsidiary Enex Oakbridge Pty Ltd), with a 78% stake hold, with the other stakeholders being Toyota Tsusho Corporation (through Tomen Corporation), JFE SHOJI Trade Corporation, putting the total stake of Glencore in Bulga Coal Pty Ltd at 68.25%

== Links to Glencore ==
The mine is managed by Glencore Coal Assets, Australia.

The Bulga Coal complex site is also the headquarters of Glencore Coal NSW (Xstrata Coal's largest operating division) as part of the mine site.

== History ==
The Bulga Coal Complex was originally started by BHP Limited as the Saxonvale Mine in 1982. It was later brought by Elders Resources in 1988, and then sold to Oakbridge Limited in 1989. Shortly after Oakbridge Limited purchased the complex, Japan's Nippon Oil bought part of the mine and renamed it Bulga Coal. Glencore (through Enex Resources Limited) bought a stake in the mine 2000. Glencore's stake was purchased by Xstrata plc when it floated on the LSE.
