= Communis =

Communis may refer to:

== Anatomy ==
- Anulus tendineus communis or annulus of Zinn, a ring of fibrous tissue surrounding the optic nerve
- Carotis communis, the common carotid artery
- Extensor digitorum communis, a muscle of the posterior forearm present in humans

== Other uses ==
- Canis lupus communis, the Russian wolf, a subspecies of the grey wolf occurring in north-central Russia
- Communis opinio, a Latin phrase referring to "common opinion," or "the generally accepted view"
- Doctor Communis, a term for Saint Thomas Aquinas (ca. 1225-1274), an Italian priest of the Roman Catholic Church
- Fratres Communis Vitae, a Roman Catholic religious community founded in the 14th century
- Res communis, the public domain
- Sensus communis, the part of the psyche responsible for binding the inputs of the individual sense organs

== See also ==
- Commune (disambiguation)
- Communism (disambiguation)
- Vulgaris (disambiguation), another Latin adjective with the same meaning.
