= Commune =

A commune is a term for an intentional community in which people hold property in common. Commune or comună or comune or other derivations may also refer to:

== Administrative-territorial entities ==
- Commune (administrative division), a municipality or township
  - Communes of Algeria
  - Communes of Angola
  - Communes of Belgium
  - Communes of Benin
  - Communes of Burundi
  - Communes of Chile
  - Communes of the Democratic Republic of the Congo
  - Communes of France
  - Communes of Italy, called comune
  - Communes of Luxembourg
  - Communes of Moldova, called comună
  - Communes of Niger
  - Communes of Romania, called comună
  - Communes of Switzerland
  - Commune-level subdivisions (Vietnam)
    - Commune (Vietnam)
    - Commune-level town (Vietnam)
  - People's commune, highest of three administrative levels in rural China, 1958 to 1983

== Government and military/defense ==
- Agricultural commune, intentional community based on agricultural labor
  - Obshchina, peasant village community in Imperial Russia (19th-20th century)
- Commune (rebellion), a synonym for uprising or revolutionary government
  - Paris Commune (1789–1795), the government of Paris from 1792 until 1795
  - Paris Commune (1871), a radical socialist and revolutionary government that ruled Paris from 18 March to 28 May 1871
  - Lyon Commune (1870–1871)
  - Besançon Commune (1871)
  - Strandzha Commune (1903)
  - Morelos Commune (c. 1913–1917)
- Medieval commune, a form of mutual defense alliance

== Arts, entertainment, and media ==
=== Films ===
- La Commune (Paris, 1871), a 2000 French film
- Commune (film), a 2005 documentary about Black Bear Ranch narrated by Peter Coyote
- The Commune, a 2016 Danish film

=== Music ===
- Commune (album) by Goat 2014
- Commune, a 2003 album by Japanese singer Yuki Isoya

=== Other uses in arts, entertainment, and media ===
- Comunes Collective, a non-profit organization
- Commune FC, a football club in Burkina Faso
- The Commune, anarchist newspaper published by Guy Aldred
- The commune, a book by Margaret Buckley (published in 1992 by Chrysalis Press in the UK, ISBN 978-1897765067)

== See also ==
- Communis (disambiguation)
- Kommune (disambiguation)
