= Paikiniana =

Scientific classification
- Kingdom: Animalia
- Phylum: Arthropoda
- Subphylum: Chelicerata
- Class: Arachnida
- Order: Araneae
- Infraorder: Araneomorphae
- Family: Linyphiidae
- Genus: Paikiniana; Eskov, 1992

Type species
- P. bella (Paik, 1978)

Species
- 10, see text

Genus of spiders

Paikiniana is a genus of Asian dwarf spiders that was first described by K. Y. Eskov in 1992.

== Species ==
As of May 2019 it contains ten species:

- Paikiniana bella (Paik, 1978) (type) – Korea
- Paikiniana biceps Song & Li, 2008 – China
- Paikiniana furcata Zhao & Li, 2014 – China
- Paikiniana iriei (Ono, 2007) – Japan
- Paikiniana keikoae (Saito, 1988) – Japan
- Paikiniana lurida (Seo, 1991) – Korea, Japan
- Paikiniana mikurana Ono, 2010 – Japan
- Paikiniana mira (Oi, 1960) – China, Korea, Japan
- Paikiniana operta Irfan & Peng, 2018 – China
- Paikiniana vulgaris (Oi, 1960) – Korea, Japan
