= Xstrata =

Former mining company

Xstrata plc
- Type: Private company
- Industry: Metals, Mining and other Investments
- Founded: 1926
- Fate: Reversed IPO – Private Company
- Headquarters: Zug, Switzerland (Head office); London, England (Registered office)
- Key people: Sir John Bond (Chairman); Mick Davis (CEO to 2014)
- Products: Precious Metals, Metals, Non Metals, and Special Ore Materials
- Revenue: $31.618 billion (2012)
- Operating income: $4.790 billion (2012)
- Net income: $1.180 billion (2012)
- Number of employees: 35,000 (2018)
- Website: www.xstrata.com.mx

Xstrata plc was an Anglo-Swiss multinational mining company headquartered in Zug, Switzerland and with its registered office in London, United Kingdom. It was a major producer of coal (and the world's largest exporter of thermal coal), copper, nickel, primary vanadium and zinc and the world's largest producer of ferrochrome. It had operations in 19 countries across Africa, Asia, Australia, Europe, North America and South America.

Xstrata had a primary listing on the London Stock Exchange and was a constituent of the FTSE 100 Index. It had a market capitalisation of approximately £29 billion as of 23 December 2011, making it the 16th-largest company on the London Stock Exchange. It had a secondary listing on the SIX Swiss Exchange. In the 2013 Forbes Global 2000, Xstrata was ranked as the 202nd largest public company in the world.

On 2 May 2013 Xstrata was acquired by Glencore. Glencore later retired the Xstrata brand, and the company name changed from Glencore Xstrata plc to Glencore plc.

The Xstrata name survives in the Mexican foreign capital company Xstrata Mexico.

== History ==
The company was founded in 1926 in Switzerland as Südelektra, an infrastructure and electricity projects concern operating in Latin America.

In 1990, Marc Rich + Co AG became its majority shareholder. In the 1990s it diversified into mining and disposed of its non-core businesses.

Mick Davis was appointed CEO of Xstrata in 2001, and it was first listed on the London Stock Exchange in 2002 at which time it acquired Glencore's coal assets in Australia and South Africa. Glencore controlled 40% of Xstrata stock in 2001.

In 2003, Xstrata doubled in size with the A$2.9 billion takeover of Australian copper, zinc and lead miner MIM Holdings. However, it failed in a 2005 bid for another Australian miner, WMC Resources, which was captured by BHP, the world's biggest mining company.

In 2004, Xstrata closed its recently purchased Windimurra Vanadium plant in Western Australia which had the effect of increasing Vanadium prices received for Xstrata's other Vanadium mines around the world. Many hundreds of people were put out of work.

In August 2005, Xstrata purchased a 19.9% stake in Falconbridge Nickel Mines, a diversified Canadian mining company producing copper, nickel, aluminum, lead and zinc. Following a contested take-over battle with Inco Limited, Xstrata acquired the remaining 80.1% of Falconbridge in August 2006.

In 2006, The Northern Territory and Australian Governments approved the expansion of the McArthur River zinc mine, near the popular fishing destination of Borrooloola. The expansion involves diversion of the river to a new 5.5 km channel, to allow construction of a massive open-cut pit in the existing river. On behalf of the traditional owners of the region – the Yanyuwa, Marra, Garrawa and Gurdanji peoples – the Northern Land Council launched a legal challenge to the Northern Territory Government's decision to approve the mining of and diversion of the McArthur River. On 1 May 2007, The Northern Territory Supreme Court ruled in favour of the Northern Land Council to stop the expansion. On 3 May 2007, the Northern Territory government rushed through retrospective legislation to overrule the court decision and allow the open-cut mine to proceed.

On 28 May 2012 violent repression of local residents by the police in the province of Espinar, Cuzco, Peru, caused the deaths of two civilians. The inhabitants protested against the pollution of the water sources caused by Xstrata's mining activities. The government has decreed a State of Emergency and suspended civil liberties guaranteed in the Constitution.

On 2 May 2013 Xstrata was acquired by Glencore, and retired Davis and his team.

Xstrata Mexico, created in 2011 as a special-purpose vehicle to develop iron ore mining in Mexico, continues to use the Xstrata name, though it halted its mining activities in Mexico in 2015, and in 2016 moved into agribusiness.

== Operations ==
After 2000, it developed from a small player into one of the world's largest diversified mining groups with the help of a series of large acquisitions. In 2008, its degree of transnationality according to the Transnationality Index was 93.2 percent and ranked first place. It had major operations/projects in eighteen countries (Australia, Argentina, Brazil, Canada, Chile, Colombia, the Dominican Republic, Germany, Jamaica, New Caledonia, Norway, Papua New Guinea, Peru, South Africa, Spain, Tanzania, the United States and the United Kingdom) and it was a major producer of copper, coking coal, thermal coal, nickel, ferrochrome, vanadium and zinc. It had smaller scale involvement in aluminum, gold, lead and silver. It also had interests in platinum group metals through its 24.9% stake in Lonmin.

In July 2012, Xstrata opened its first office in mainland China. China accounted for up to one-third of Xstrata's global sales. The office was located in Shanghai.

=== Bulga Coal ===
Xstrata were the operators of the Bulga Coal Mine in NSW, Australia. Xstrata managed this mine on behalf of the Bulga Coal Pty Ltd shareholders from 2001 when it purchased Enex Resources Limited from Glencore International AG. The Bulga Coal mine site served as the headquarters for Xstrata Coal's NSW division.

=== Mangoola coal mine controversy ===
In 2007 Xstrata Coal bought the Mangoola coal mine in the Hunter Valley from Centennial Coal. After this, Xstrata Coal came under media scrutiny numerous times in regards to the company's management of the pre-mining stage of the mining project. Most notably scrutinised was the community relations approach of Xstrata Coal towards the local community, with allegations of misleading actions on behalf of the company being cited in the local and regional media, and other regional and local communication channels. This included the setting up of a local action group in opposition to the mine named WAG (Wybong Action Group).

=== George Fisher mine ===
In October 2010, Xstrata's A$274 million expansion plan for the George Fisher mine at Mount Isa was approved by the government of Queensland

== Relationship with Glencore ==
When Mick Davis was appointed CEO of Xstrata in 2001, Glencore controlled 40% of Xstrata stock. Xstrata had the option of using Glencore as a marketing agent. In 2006, Glencore leaders Willy Strothotte and Ivan Glasenberg were on the board of Xstrata, which Strothotte chaired.

In June 2012, following a previous announcement of a merger between Glencore and Xstrata, the two companies began to reconsider the proposed retention package for their merger, due to shareholder opposition to a huge payout for executives. In total, 73 key executives stood to receive over GBP 170 million under the initial retention package.

In July 2012, Xstrata announced that the Court Meeting originally scheduled for 12 July 2012 to approve the details of the merger between Xstrata and Glencore had been adjourned to 7 September 2012. After the merger with Glencore, the Xstrata CFO Trevor Reid announced that he would not continue to work as employee but as consultant. After 11 years of involvement, this marks a massive shift in the company's strategy and the group is entering a post-Reid era.

== The Xstrata name ==
The Xstrata name, which evokes the activities of mining and extraction, was created in 1999 by John Lloyd of the British corporate identity consultancy Lloyd Northover. Glencore has also announced that they will no longer use the 'Xstrata' brand and it will be phased out. Glencore Xstrata plc is now Glencore plc.
