= Canada Development Corporation =

The Canada Development Corporation was a Canadian corporation, based in Toronto, created and partly owned by the federal government and charged with developing and maintaining Canadian-controlled companies in the private sector through a mixture of public and private investment. It was technically not a crown corporation as it was intended to generate a profit and was created with the intention that, eventually, the government would own no more than 10% of its holdings; it did not require approvals of the Governor-in-Council for its activities and did not report to parliament. Its objectives and capitalization, however, were set out by parliament and any changes to its objects decided upon by the Board of Directors had to be approved by parliament.

== History ==
The CDC was created as a result of Walter Gordon's Royal Commission on Canada's Economic Prospects, and the 1968 Watkins Report commissioned by Gordon, in an attempt to redress the problem of foreign ownership in the Canadian economy by stimulating the development of Canadian owned corporations, particularly in the field of natural resources and industry.

About 31,000 private shareholders invested in the corporation. An early purchase of the corporation was Connaught Laboratories, the original manufacturer of insulin.

Major investments owned by the CDC included holdings in petroleum, mines and petrochemicals including Polymer Corporation, an asset transferred to it by the Canadian government. By 1982 the CDC had a 58% stake in the Savin Corporation.

In 1986 the Corporation was dismantled as part of the Mulroney government's program of privatization.
