= Vulgaris =

Vulgaris, a Latin adjective meaning common, or something that is derived from the masses of common people, may refer to:

- Vulgaris aerae, the Latin translation for the Common Era
- Era Vulgaris, pseudo-Latin for Common Era (in Latin this means Common Mistress)
- Sermo vulgaris, the vulgar Latin

== See also ==
- Vulgar (disambiguation)
- Vulgare, a Latin word with the same meaning
- Vulgarism, an expression or usage considered non-standard or characteristic of uneducated speech or writing
- Communis (disambiguation)
