= Spassky District, Republic of Tatarstan =

Spassky District Спасский район (Russian)
- District

Other transcription(s)
  - Tatar: Спас районы
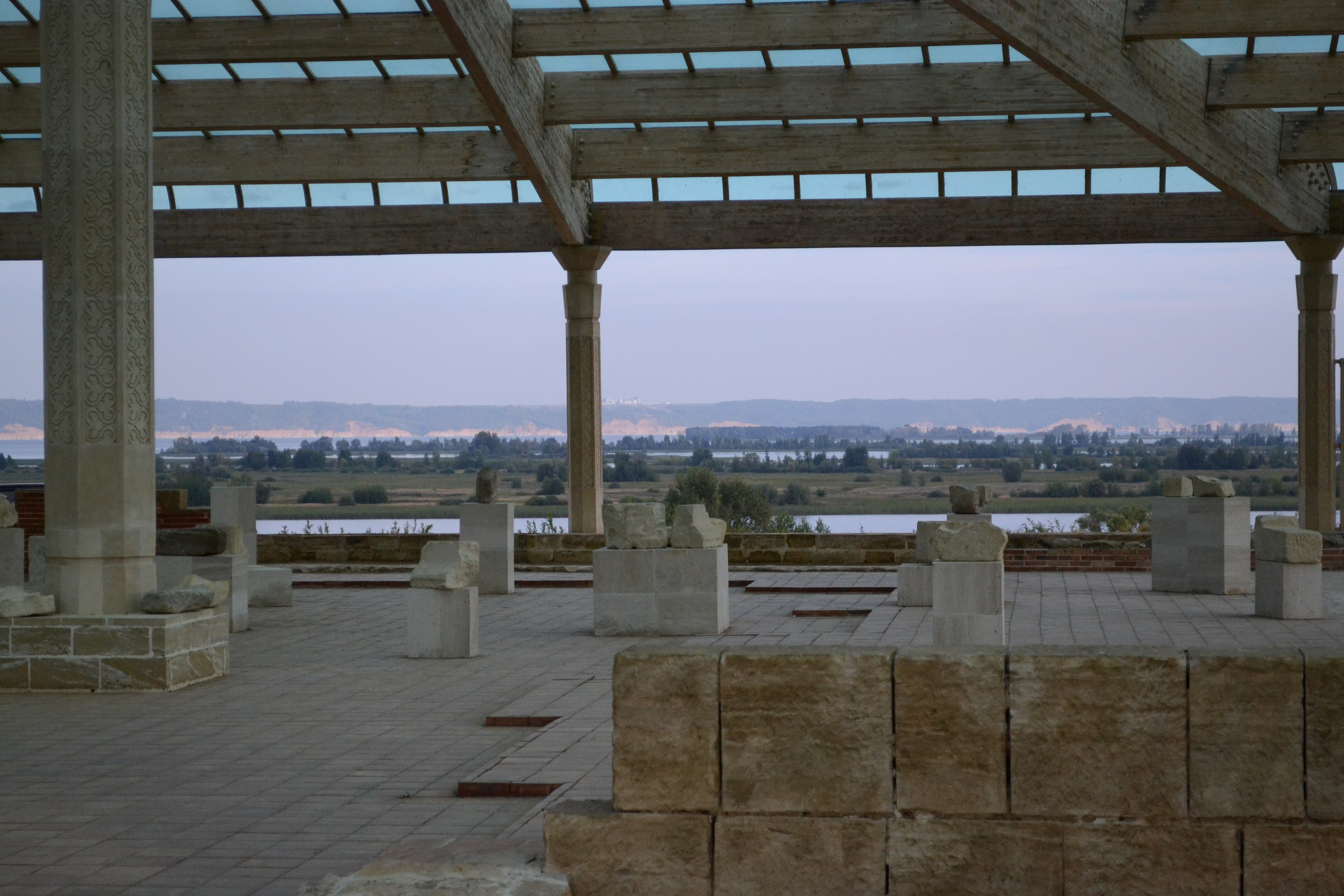
- Mound Great Bulgaria, Spassky District

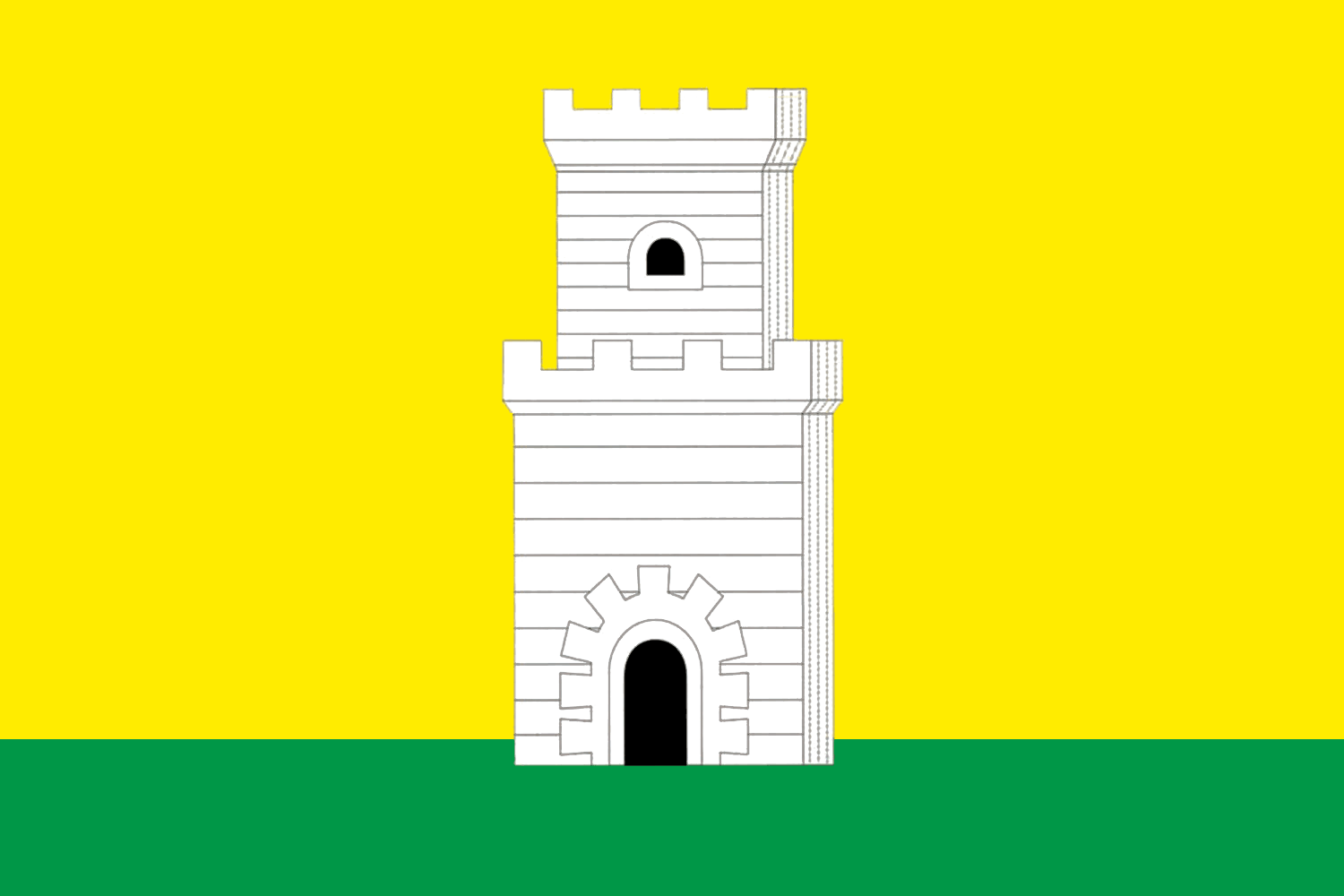
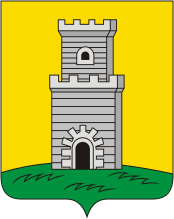
- Flag Coat of arms
- Location of Spassky District in the Republic of Tatarstan
- Coordinates: 54°58′N 49°02′E
- Country: Russia
- Federal subject: Republic of Tatarstan
- Established: 10 August 1930
- Administrative center: Bolgar

Area
  - Total: 2,028 km^{2} (783 sq mi)

Population (2010 Census)
  - Total: 20,554
  - Density: 10.14/km^{2} (26.25/sq mi)
  - Urban: 42.1%
  - Rural: 57.9%

Administrative structure
  - Inhabited localities: 1 cities/towns, 45 rural localities

Municipal structure
  - Municipally incorporated as: Spassky Municipal District
  - Municipal divisions: 1 urban settlements, 16 rural settlements
- Time zone: UTC+3 (MSK)
- OKTMO ID: 92632000
- Website: http://spasskiy.tatarstan.ru/

Spassky District (Russian: Спа́сский райо́н; Tatar: Спас районы) is a territorial administrative unit and municipal district of the Republic of Tatarstan within the Russian Federation. The total area of the district is 2028 km². It is located in the southwestern part of Tatarstan. The administrative center is Bolgar. As of 2020, the population estimated at 18,599 residents.

Traditionally the Spassky district specializes in fur farming and grain farming. Agricultural land occupies up to 117.8 thousand hectares, while pa around 16.3 thousand hectares is pastureland. The largest agricultural investors are the Avangard forage company, the Bulgar plant growing farm and the Khuzangaevskoe agricultural enterprise.

The remains of previous Bulgarian settlements form a historical site Bolghar which starting from 2014 has been a part of the UNESCO Heritage Site List.

== Location ==
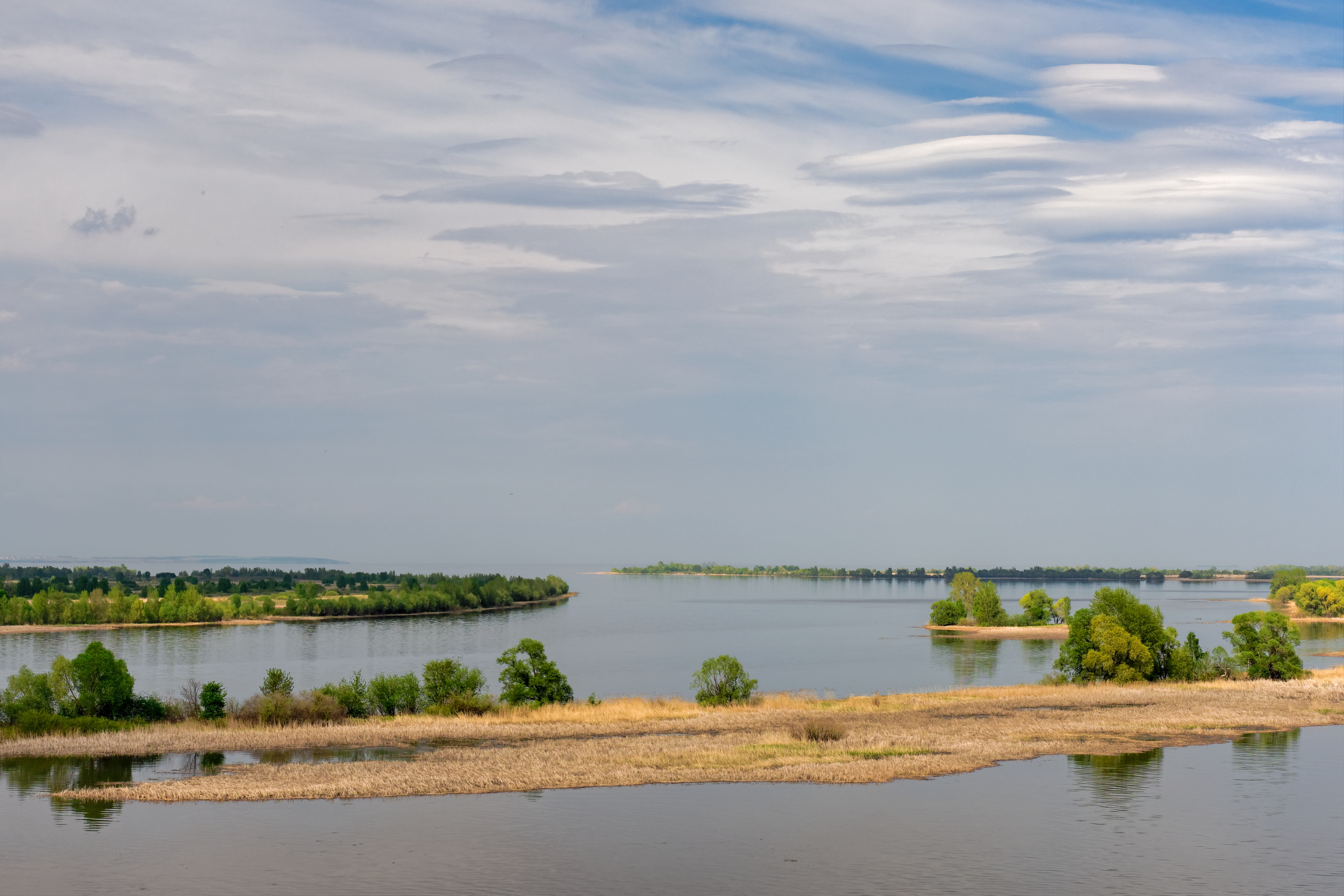
A view on Volga river from Bolghar, 2018

In the east, the Spassky District borders the Alkeevsky and Alekseevsky Districts of Tatarstan, in the south - on the Ulyanovsk Oblast (Staromaynsky District and Melekessky Districts). In the watershed of the Volga (Kuybyshev Reservoir) it borders on the Tetyushsky, Kamsko-Ustinsky regions, along the waters of the Kama - with the Laishevsky District. In addition to the Volga and Kama, the largest rivers passing through the territory are the Abyss and Aktay. Also in the Spassky district there is lake Abkalarkul.

The district is located in the forest-steppe belt with a green zone or woodland occupying around 9% of the land. Most of the Spassky District is located on a low-lying plain, the average height of which does not exceed 60–70 meters, with a slight slope in the northwest direction. The highest point of the relief is in the southeastern part of the region and is 153 meters. Permian Pliocene and superficial deposits can be found in the region. Among the mineral deposits there are sands and clays, which are often used in construction.

== Coat of arms ==
The contemporary coat of arms of the district is based on the historical coat of arms of the city of Spassk in Kazan Province. The flag repeats the colors and the image of the coat of arms and depicts an ancient tower standing in a golden field. The tower symbolizes reliability and a fortitude of spirit. Silver color is a symbol of purity, perfection, purity, mutual understanding. Black symbolizes eternity, wisdom, modesty.

== History ==
People started to settle in the district around 60 000 years ago. The first settlements began to appear in the VIII-III centuries BC when the representatives of the Ananyino culture arrived. In VI-VIIth centuries the Bulgar tribes settled in the region while searching the new lands in the Volga region. Later Bulgars formed a feudal state Volga Bulgaria the population of which mostly engaged in agriculture, sowing wheat, rye, barley, millet, peas, oats, rye. In 922, on the territory of the Volga Bulgars, the ancestors of the modern Kazan Tatars officially converted to Islam.

In the first half of the XIII century, the territory of the Volga Bulgars was captured by the Mongols. For a century and a half, the majority of the population abandoned the Zakamye and moved to the Predkamye. Thus, during the period of the Khanate of Kazan and the first century after the siege of Kazan (in 1552), the territory remained uninhabited. Resettlement of the region began only in the second half of the XVII century, after the construction of the Zakamskaya zasechnaya line - a system of defense structures built in the period from the XVI to the XVII centuries on the southern borders of Russia to protect against nomads. In the second half of the 17th century, servicemen, archers, captured Poles, Chuvash and Mordovians began to resettle in the region.

The Spassky district was formed on August 10, 1930. Until 1920, the territory of the region belonged to the Spassky district of the Kazan province, and in the period between 1920 and 1930 - to the Spassky canton of the TASSR. At the time of formation, the district included 1 city and 41 village councils, 95 settlements, in which 52,504 people lived (46,231 Russians, 4641 Tatars, 1632 representatives of other nationalities). In 1935, part of the land became part of the Kuznechikhinsky district. In 1935, the city of Spassk was renamed the city of Kuibyshev in honor of the revolutionary and party leader Valerian Kuybyshev. The Spassky district was also named Kuibyshevsky. In 1940, the area of the district was 1762 km², and the population was 49.4 thousand people.

During the Kuybyshev reservoir construction in the 1950s, Spassk was faced the danger of flooding. For this reason, the Soviet government initiated the resettlement of the city which lasted from 1953 to 1957. A new Kuibyshev city was placed near the village of Bolgary, 120 kilometers from Kazan and 100 kilometers from Ulyanovsk. Despite the relocation of one of its major cities, the Spassky district suffered greatly from flooding associated with the construction of the reservoir. More than a hundred villages and the city of Spassk itself were submerged, more than half of the archaeological monuments belonging to the period of the Volga Bulgaria and the Kazan Khanate were destroyed by water.

During the 1960s, the region was actively developing. At that time a meat processing plant, a bakery, a brewery, a grain-receiving enterprise, an oil depot, residential buildings, and administrative buildings were erected. As of 1960, the area of the district was 1700.6 km². Thanks to the reform of the administrative-territorial division of the TASSR in 1965, the territory of the district increased to 2026 km², and the population was 38.7 thousand people.

In 1991 the district was again renamed to Spassky while city of Kuybyshev received a name Bolgar in honor of the historic state.

From 1995 to 2019, the district was headed by Kamil Nugaev. After him, the post of head of the district was occupied by the former director of the Bulgarian State Historical and Architectural Museum-Reserve Fargat Mukhametov.

== Population ==
According to the 2010 census, the region has the highest share of the Russian population in Tatarstan - 67.6%.

43.31% of the population of the region live in urban conditions (the city of Bolgar).

== Municipal-territorial structure ==
The Spassky municipal district has 1 urban and 16 rural settlements and 46 settlements within them.

== Economy ==
Since the 2000s, Spassky District has traditionally occupied one of the lowest rungs in the socio-economic development of municipal districts rankings. Thus, in 2015 and 2016, there were high levels of unemployment, low average wages and a drop in the population. Since 2003, the number of residents has decreased by more than 2000 people. However, by 2019, the district had climbed 16 ranks and took 29th place in the development rating of Tatarstan districts. The indicators improved thanks to a decrease in the unemployment rate from 0.76% to 0.39%, an increase in wages (up to 2.15% of the minimum consumer budget), an increase in the number of shipments of own-produced goods (3 billion compared to 2.6 billion in 2018 year), as well as the growth of the district's authority due to the opening of the Bulgarian Islamic Academy and the Kul Gali complex.

As of 2016, about 500 entrepreneurs were registered in the district. Large budget-generating companies include a meat processing plant and a grain-receiving center. The meat-packing plant (the modern name is "Spassky meat-packing plant") was launched in 1966 as an enterprise with a full production cycle, starting from a cattle reception point and ending with the release of finished products.

The grain infrastructure is represented by the Spassky Grain Reception Enterprise, the successor of the enterprise founded in 1918 on the basis of merchant warehouses. The modern company is a diversified farm that receives grain harvested from the fields from all over the country, and the grain is shipped by water transport. The enterprise also produces pasta and cereals.

Other large regional companies are “Suvar B” (oversees the operation of highways and highways), “Bolgarnefteprodukt” (a subsidiary of Tatneft), “Spassky District Electric Networks”, “Bolgarles”, and the construction company “Spasagrostroy”.

Regional agricultural lands occupy 117.8 thousand hectares, including pastures that take up to 16.3 thousand hectares. Local producers cultivate wheat, winter rye, barley, oats, millet, peas. The main investors in the development of agriculture in the region are the fodder procurement company "Avangard", the plant growing VZP "Bulgar", the agricultural "Khuzangaevskoe".

=== Investment potential ===
In 2020, the amount of investments in fixed assets per capita reached 56 175 thousand rubles which become one of the lowest rates among the municipalities of Tatarstan. The district authorities aim to attract investment in tourism since one of the most important historical and cultural sites of Tatarstan hillfort “Bolghar” is located in the district. Starting from 2015, local authorities launched the project "Cultural heritage - the island-town of Sviyazhsk and the ancient Bolgar" that attracted additional investments in the region amounting to 15.4 billion rubles, and the flow of tourists increased 18 times reaching 540 thousand visitors in 2017.

In 2018, a large tourist center "Kul Gari" with an area of 25 hectares was opened in Bolgar. Design of the hotel rooms was inspired by the historic 14th century White Chamber. This project was supervised by the Vozrozhdenie fund and personally by Mintimer Shaimiev, with the main investors being Tatneft and TAIF. Even though the total cost of the project is unknown, according to several estimations, it could have reached up to several billion rubles.

In 2020, the construction of a powerful wind farm started near with the village Izmeri. Similar wind farms will be also constructed in Rybno-Slobodsky District and Kamsko-Ustyinsky District. Among other investors will be several Turkish companies, to the sum of $200 million. The wind farms are scheduled to operate starting from 2024.

=== Transport ===
The main navigation in the region proceeds through the Volga and Kama rivers. There is a large river station along with quays, the Bolgar-gorod and Bolgar. There are also several a inter-municipal highway (Bolgar - Bazarnye Mataki, the Kim - Kuznechikha - Lesnaya Khmelevka (Ulyanovsk region) and several motorways which ensure the movement of cargo and passenger flows from west to east and from north to south inside republics and to the southern regions of the Volga Federal District.

== Ecology ==
The flora of the region is represented by 448 species of vascular plants. Of the fauna, 7 species of amphibians, 5 species of reptiles, 114 nesting bird species, 39 species of mammals have been recorded. Rare and endangered species on the territory of the region include iris sibirica, epipactis helleborine, salvinia natans. The area is home to a anguis fragilis and vipera renardi there are 21 species of birds listed in the Red Data Books of Tatarstan and Russia.

On the left coast of the Kuibyshev reservoir, is the Spassky State Nature Reserve of a complex profile, which includes a system of 64 islands and extensive shallow water reservoirs. The total area of the reserve is 17 979 hectares.

== Social sphere ==
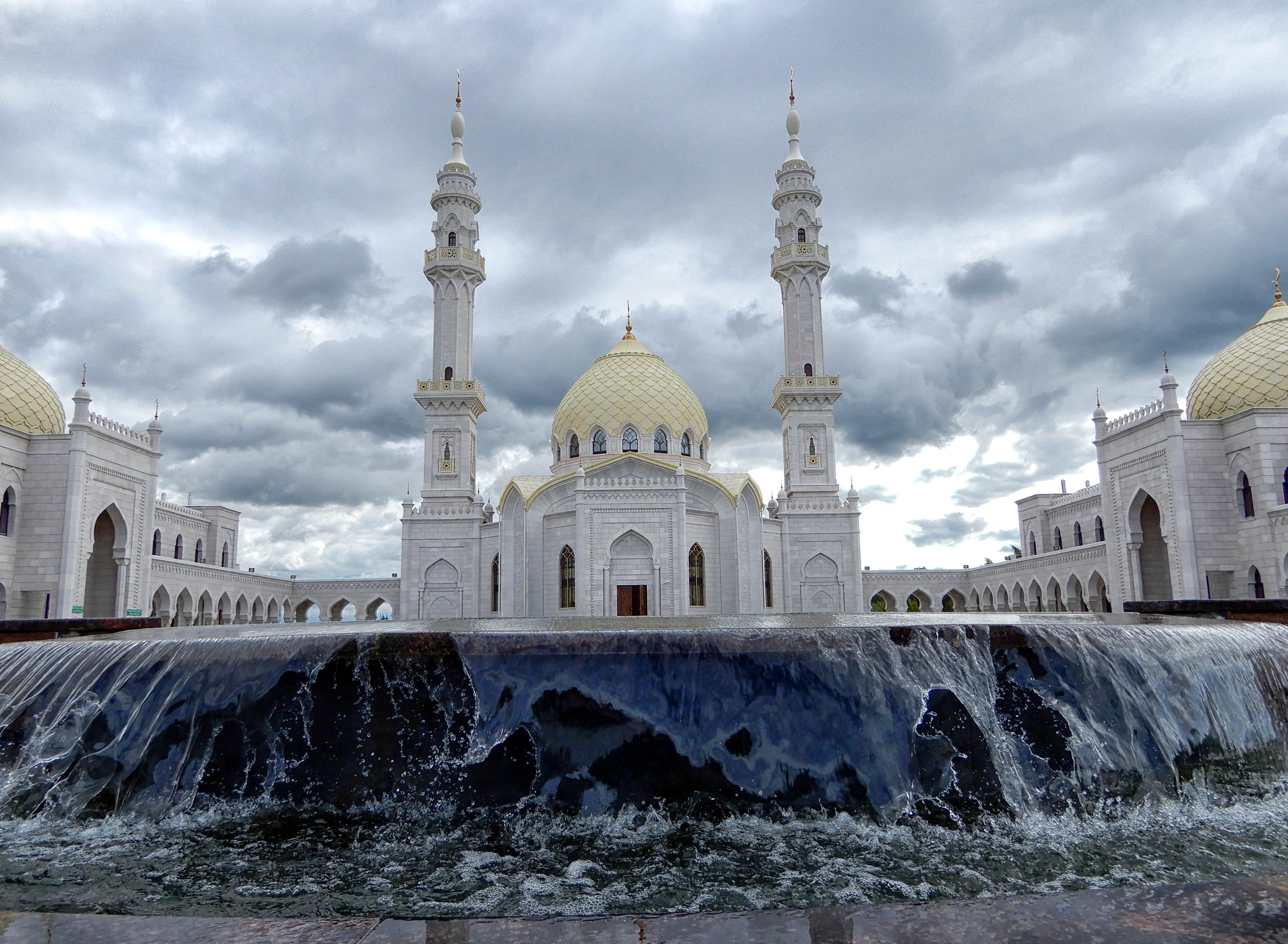
The White mosque, 2018

There are archaeological monuments from multiple eras in the region: the "Tankeyevsky burial ground" (IX-X centuries), "Settlement Suvar" (X-XIV), cultural and natural landscape "Armenian colony" (XIII-XIV), "Greek chamber" (XIV) and "Tract Aga-Bazar" (Neolithic), XIV-XV century.

In 2010 the former president of the republic Mintimer Shaimiev launched a tourism program branded as the "Revival of Bulgaria”. Within the framework of this project the White Mosque was constructed, the world's largest printed Quran was ordered (the cover of which is decorated with emeralds), while the Museum of Bread and a monument on the tomb of the Sahab were also opened. In 2014, the Bulgarian Historical and Architectural Reserve on the site of the Bulgarian settlement was included in the UNESCO World Heritage List.

Construction of the Bulgarian Islamic Academy began in 2014. The project was initiated as attempt to develop the Muslim clergy in Bolgar. More than 1.2 billion rubles were spent from the federal and local government budgets on the academy. One of the sponsors was the businessman Alisher Usmanov, who, according to various sources, donated from 250 to 500 million rubles. The opening of the academy took place in September 2017, and two years later, construction of a Muslim children's camp for schoolchildren from all over Russia began nearby.
