= Bezdna (Tatarstan) =

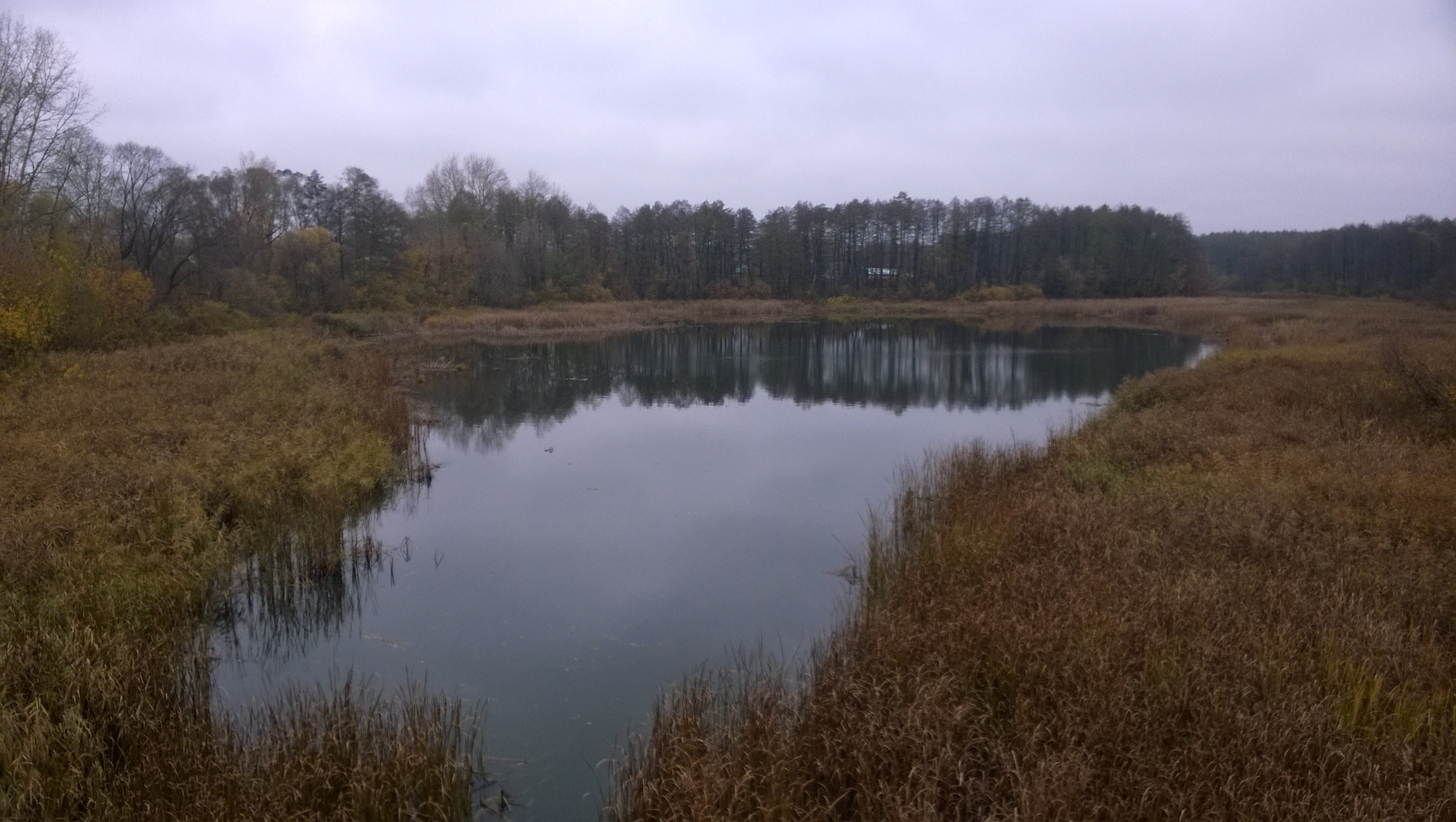

Location
- Country: Tatarstan, Russia

Physical characteristics
- Mouth: Volga
  - location: Kuralovo, Spassky District
  - coordinates: 54.9861°N 49.3338°E
  - elevation: 53 m (174 ft)
- Length: 45 km (28 mi)
- Basin size: 806 km^{2} (311 sq mi)
- Discharge
  - average: 197 m^{3}/s (7,000 cu ft/s)

Basin features
- Progression: Volga→ Caspian Sea

The Bezdna (Russian: Бездна; Tatar: Бизнә) is a river in Tatarstan, Russian Federation, a left-bank tributary of the Volga, flowing into the Kuybyshev Reservoir near Kuralovo, Spassky District. It is 45 kilometres (28 mi) long, and its drainage basin covers 805 square kilometres (311 mi^{2}).

The maximal mineralization is 300–500 mg/L. The average sediment deposition at the river mouth is 129 millimetres (5.1 in) per year. In 1963 the average discharge was 197 cubic metres per second (7,000 cu ft/s). The town of Spassk, the ancestor of modern Bolgar stood on the river prior to 1956. In 1956–57 the Kuybyshev reservoir was created, flooding the town and the lower stream of Bezdna.
