= Bolghar =

UNESCO World Heritage Site in Russia

UNESCO World Heritage Site
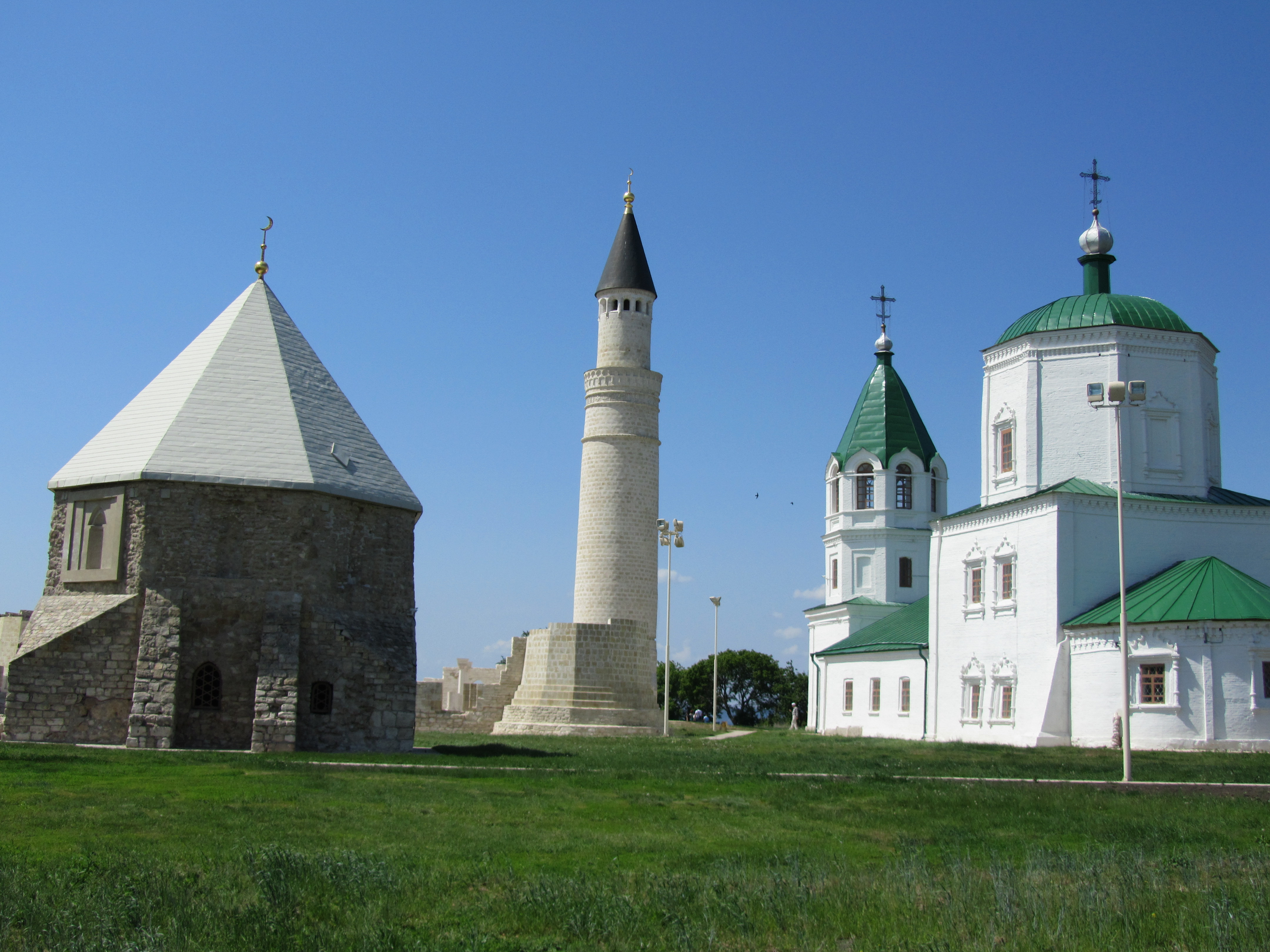

- Location within Russia
- Official name: Bolgar Historical and Archaeological Complex
- Location: Tatarstan, Russia
- Criteria: Cultural: (ii), (vi)
- Reference: 981rev
- Inscription: 2014 (38th Session)
- Area: 424 ha (1.64 sq mi)
- Buffer zone: 12,101 ha (46.72 sq mi)
- Coordinates: 54°58′44″N 49°03′23″E

Bolghar or Bolgar (Russian: Болгарское городище; Tatar: Болгар, بلغار, Bolğar; Chuvash: Аслă Пăлхар, Aslă Pălhar) was intermittently the capital of Volga Bulgaria from the 10th to the 13th centuries, along with Bilyar and Nur-Suvar. It was situated on the bank of the Volga River, about 30 km downstream from its confluence with the Kama River and some 130 km from modern Kazan in what is now Spassky District. To the west of it lies a small modern town known as Bolgar since 1991. The UNESCO World Heritage Committee inscribed Bolgar Historical and Archaeological Complex (ancient Bolghar hill fort) to the World Heritage List in 2014.

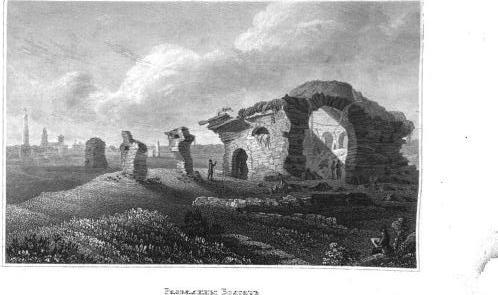
Hill fort before reconstruction (lithography of XIX)

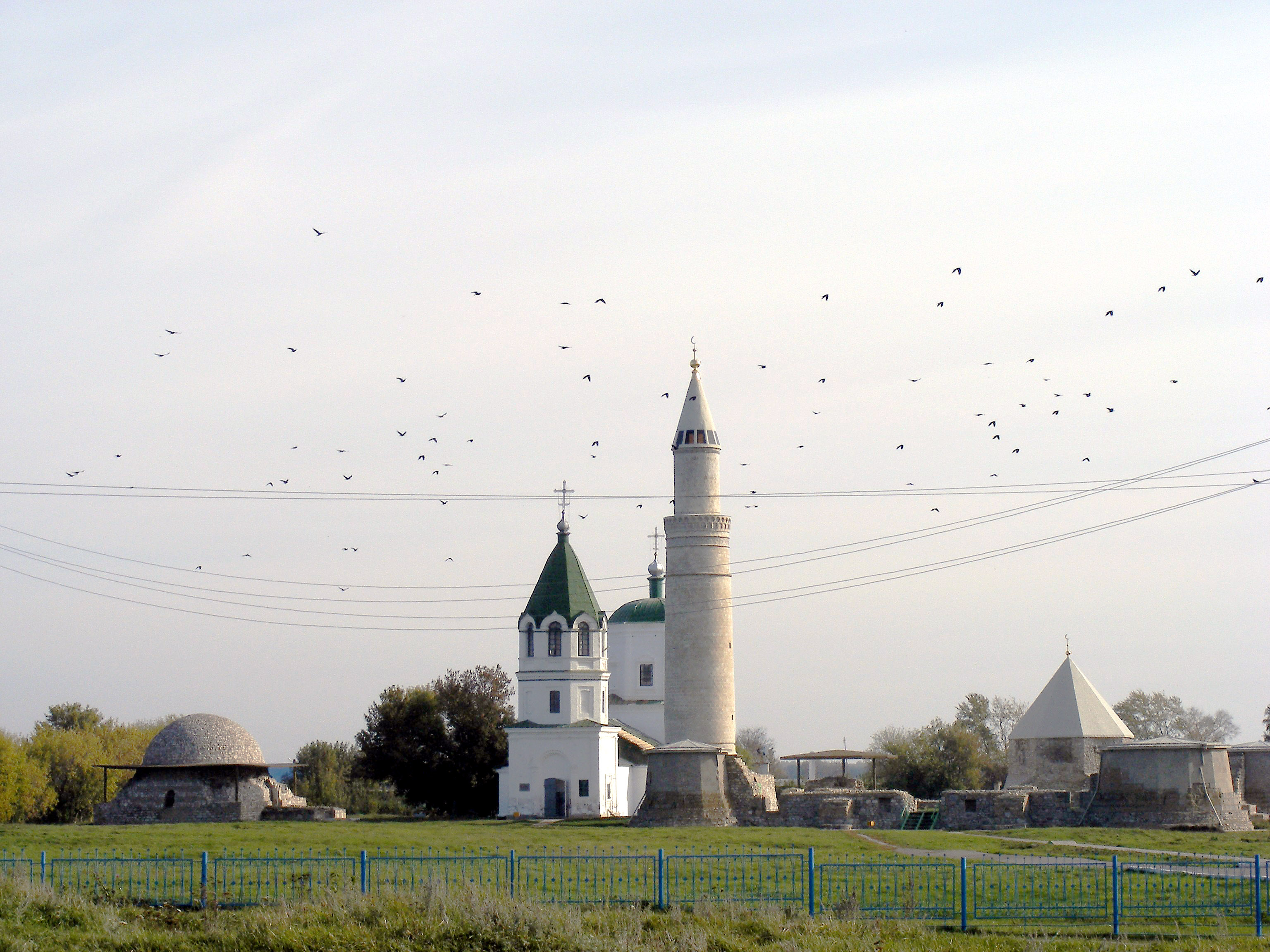
Common view to hill fort

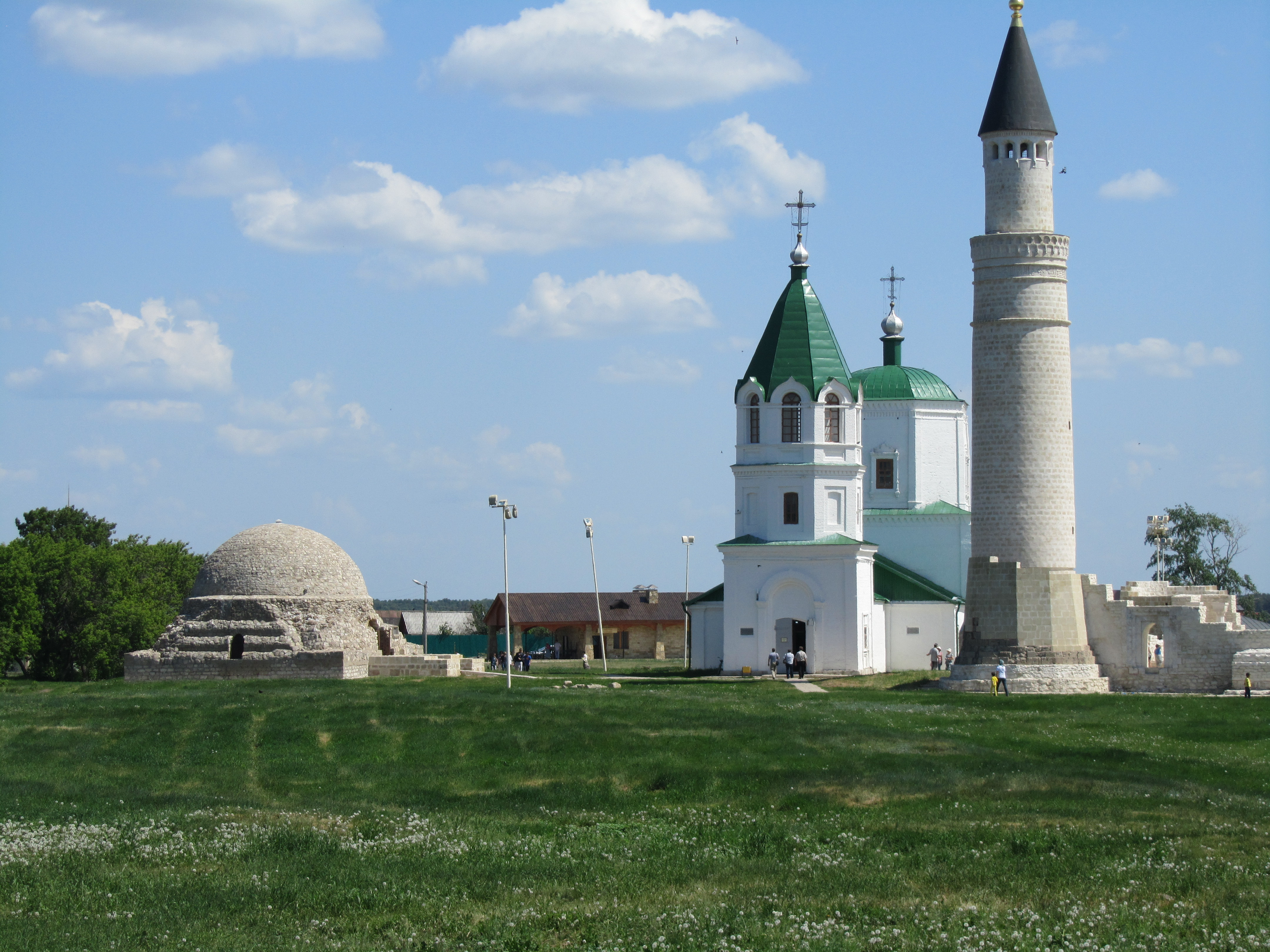
Temples of hill fort

== History ==
Bolgar was originally established in the 10th century. The city was supposedly the capital of Volga Bulgaria from as early as the 10th century. As a result of Russian incursions along the Volga, and internecine fights, the Volga Bulgar kings (khagans) were forced to intermittently move their capital to Bilyar.

During the Mongol invasion of Volga Bulgaria in the 13th century, the Golden Horde conquered the realm. A Russian annalist wrote: "In the autumn of 6744 (1236), there came from the countries of the East into the Bulgar lands the godless Tatars and sacked the good city of Bolgar and killed everyone from the old to the young and the tiniest suckling, and looted a lot of goods, and set the city on fire, and captured the whole of their land".

After the destruction of Bilyar during the Mongol invasion, the former capital lost its status due to the Mongol policy prohibiting the reconstruction of capitals. It lay outside the ulus itself, but had direct Mongol presence. The Mongols eliminated the existing socio-political structure of the Volga Bolgars. Volga Bulgaria became decentralized as a result and the new city of Kazan, known as Bolgar-al-Jadid ("the new Bolgar"), became prominent. The taxation of regions such as Bolgar, Khwarizm, Crimea and Azerbaijan filled the Golden Horde's coffers with great wealth, and the Mongols replaced the sitting rulers of Bolgar and Khwarizm with their own.

The late 14th century saw a marked decline in its fortunes. It was sacked by Bulat-Timur in 1361 during the Great Troubles. The Muscovite–Volga Bulgars war (1376) saw Muscovy and Nizhny Novgorod-Suzdal briefly capture Grand Bolgar and installing their own doroga and tamozhnia (customs collector), which probably were existing offices at the time, before the Tatars retook the city. It was endangered by Timur during the Tokhtamysh–Timur war. As a Muslim religious center Bolgar persevered until the mid-16th century when the Khanate of Kazan was conquered by the Russian Tsar Ivan IV and incorporated into the Russian state.

During Tsarist rule the site of the ancient town was settled by Russian commoners. Tsar Peter the Great issued a special ukase to preserve the surviving ruins, which was the first Russian law aimed at preserving historical heritage.

=== Little pilgrimage ===
During the Soviet period, Bolgar was a center of a local Islamic movement known as The Little Hajj; Muslims from Tatarstan and other parts of the Soviet Union could not participate in the hajj to Mecca, so they travelled instead to Bolgar.

== Monuments and temples ==
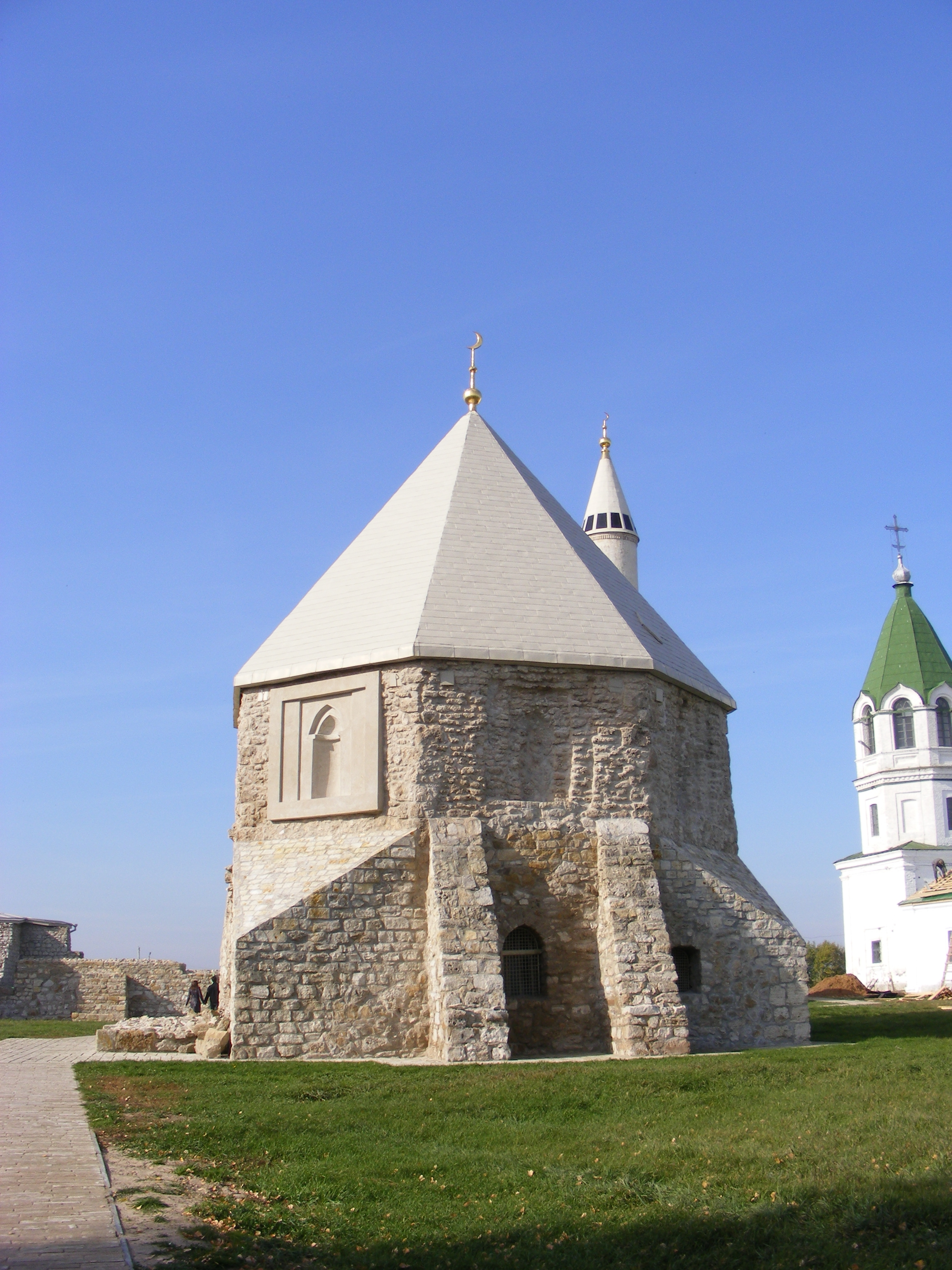
Eastern mausoleum

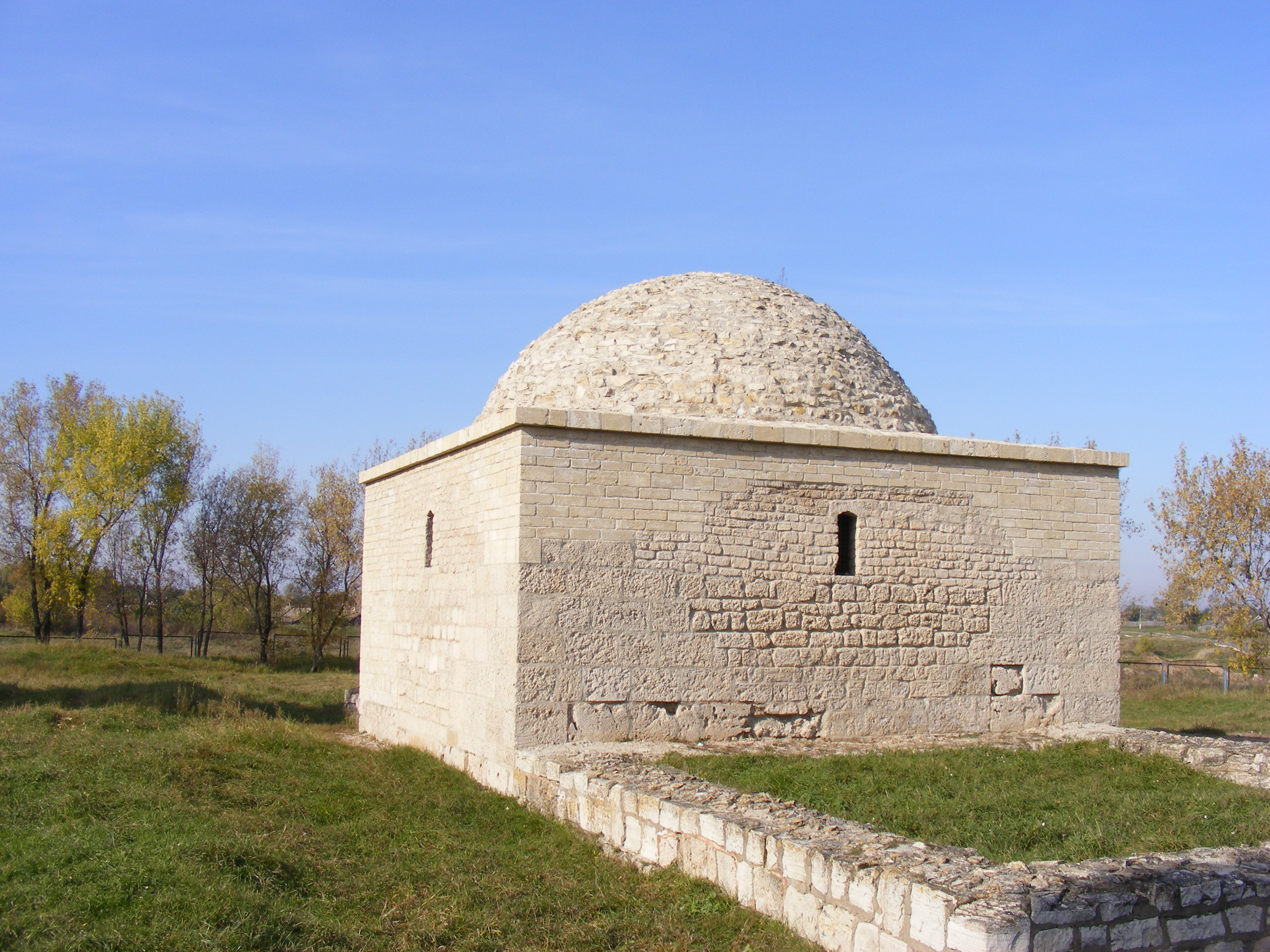
Khans' mausoleum

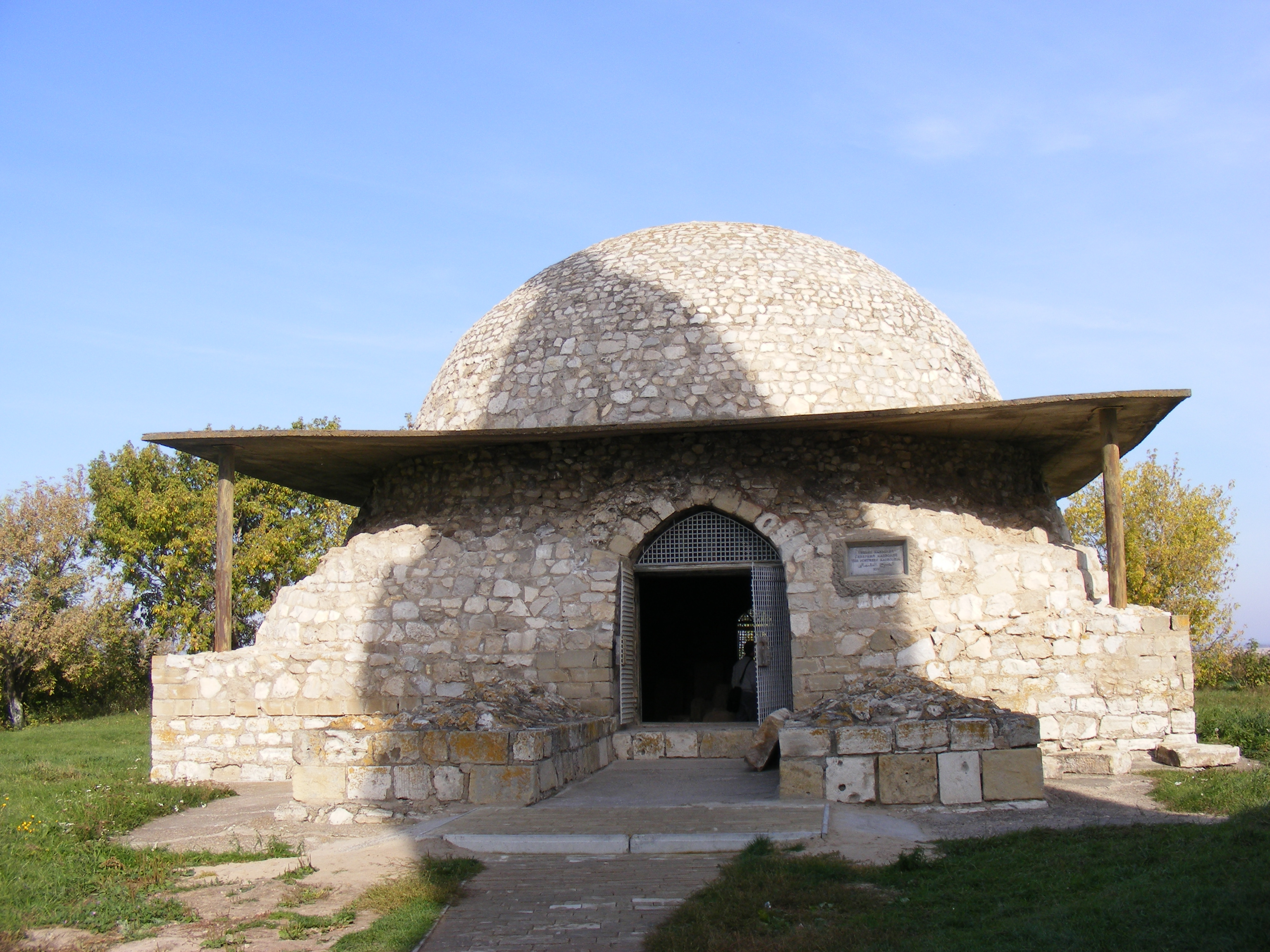
Northern mausoleum

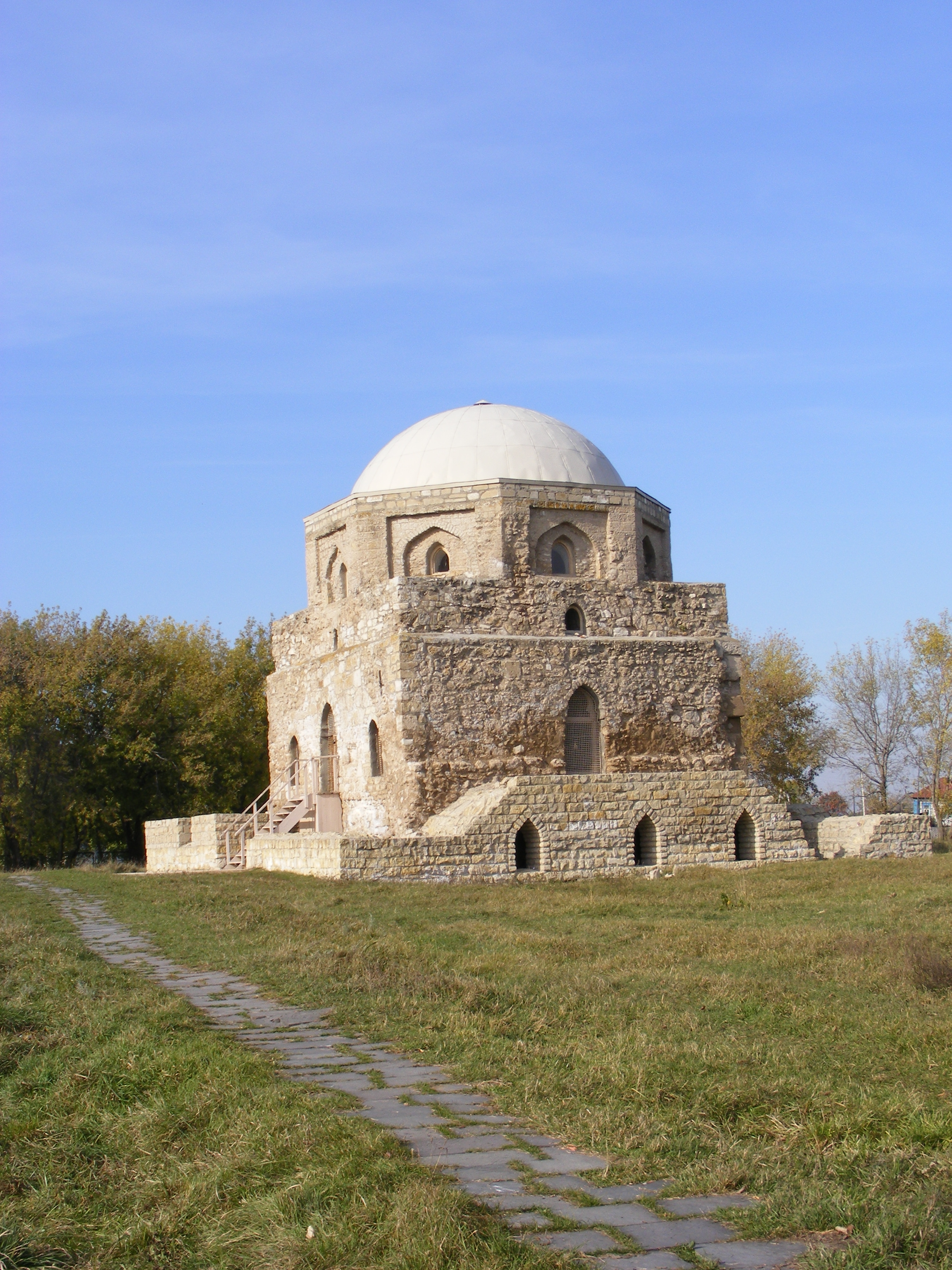
Black Chamber

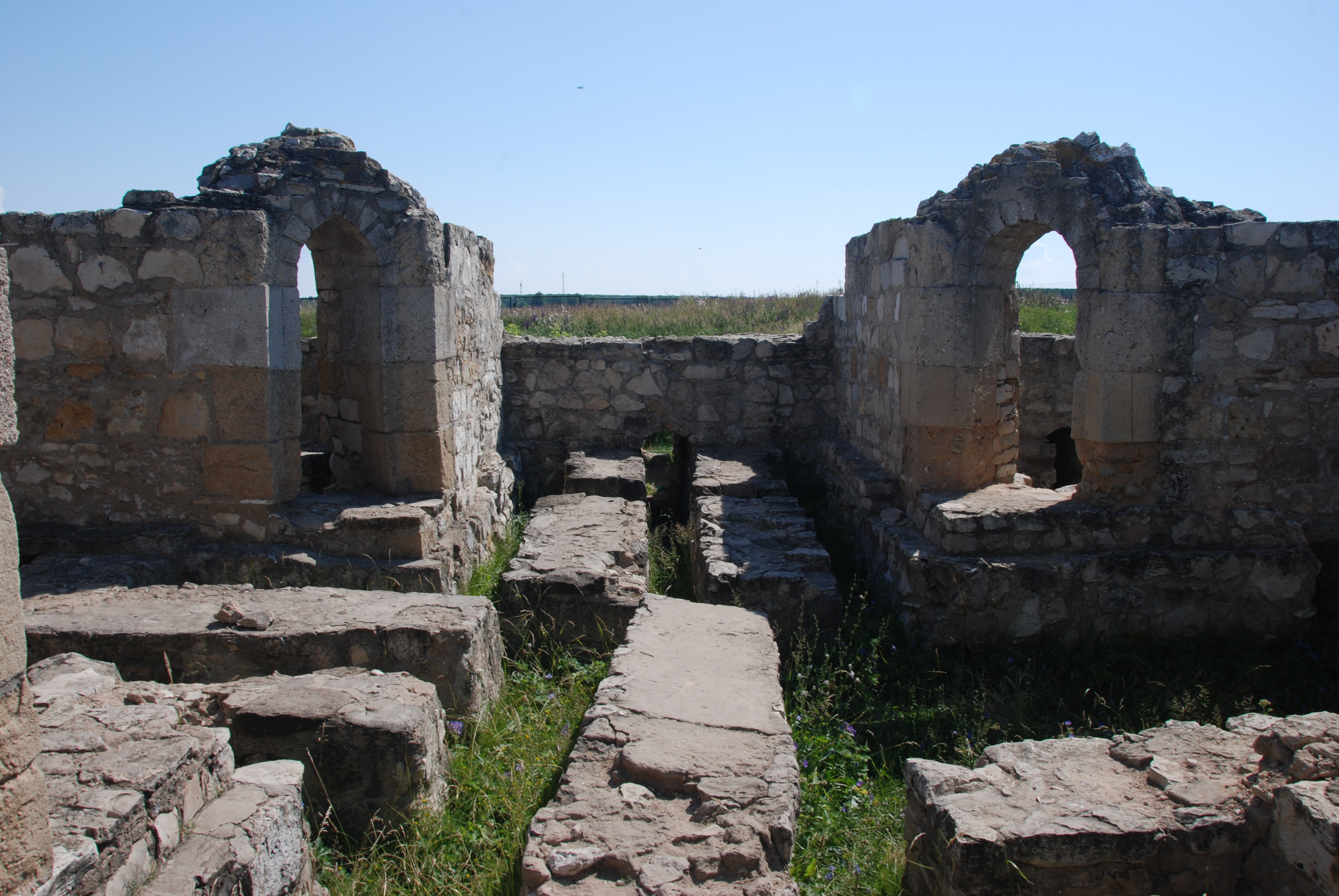
White Chamber

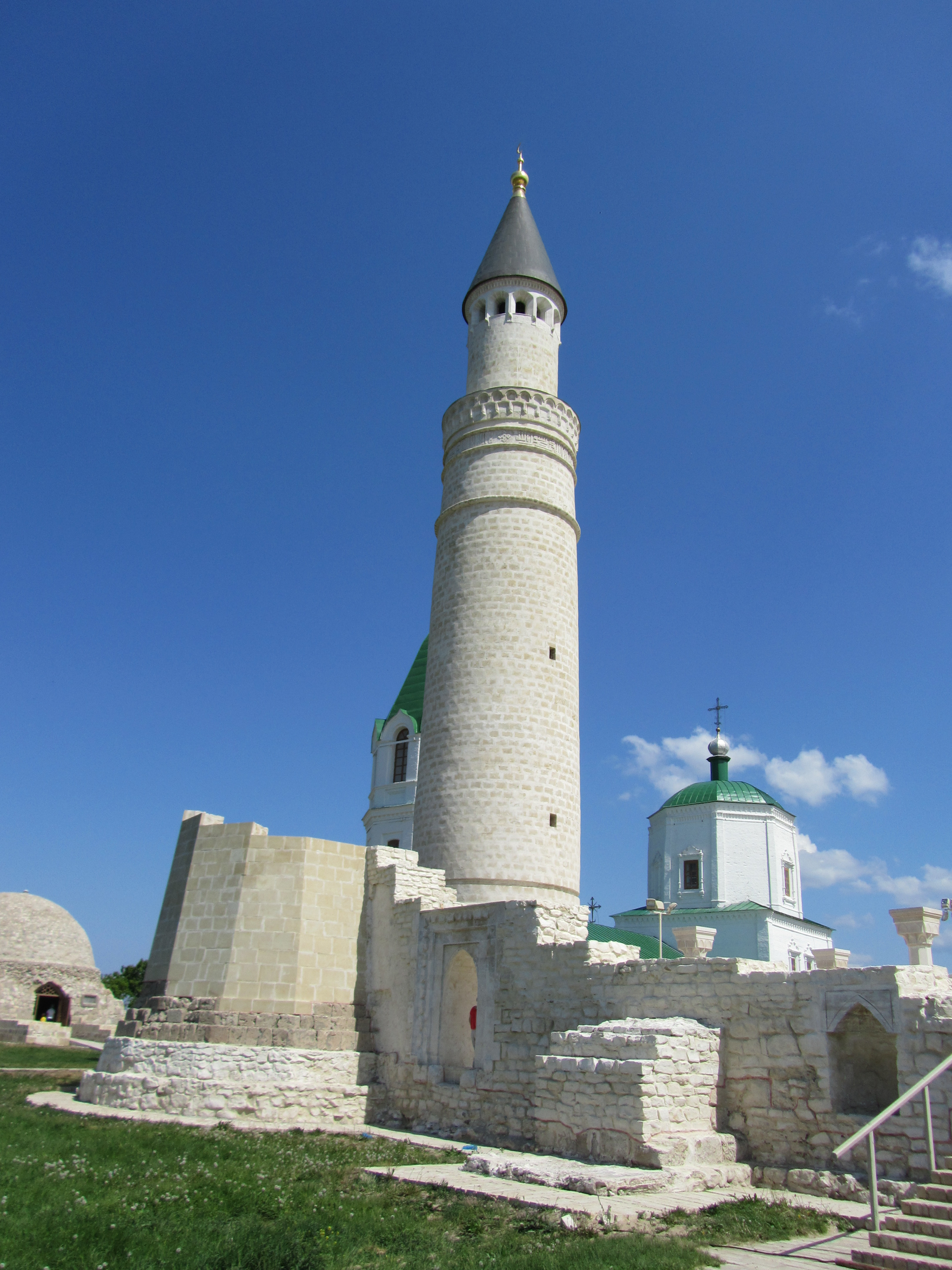
Big manara

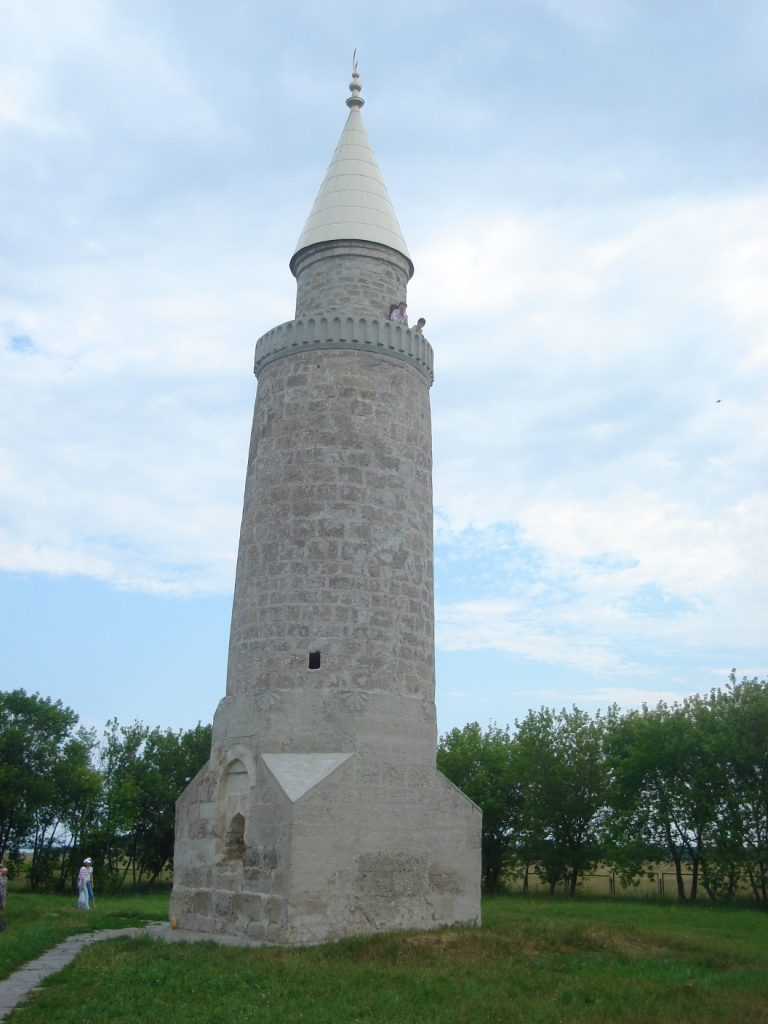
Small manara

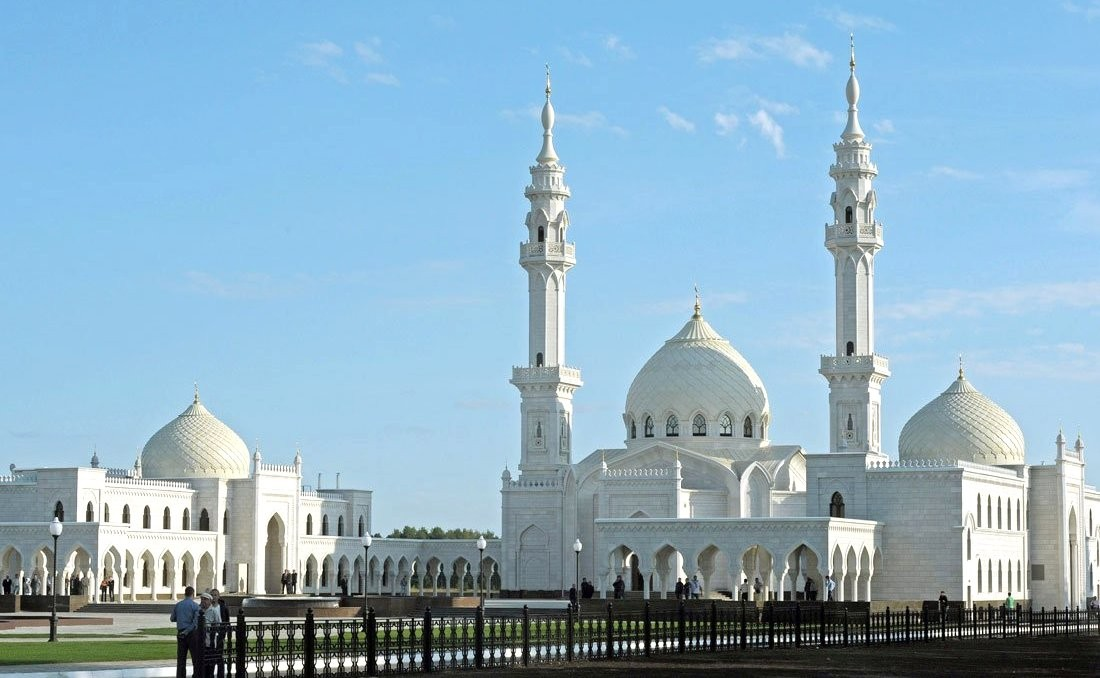
New Bolghar White Mosque

== Importance ==
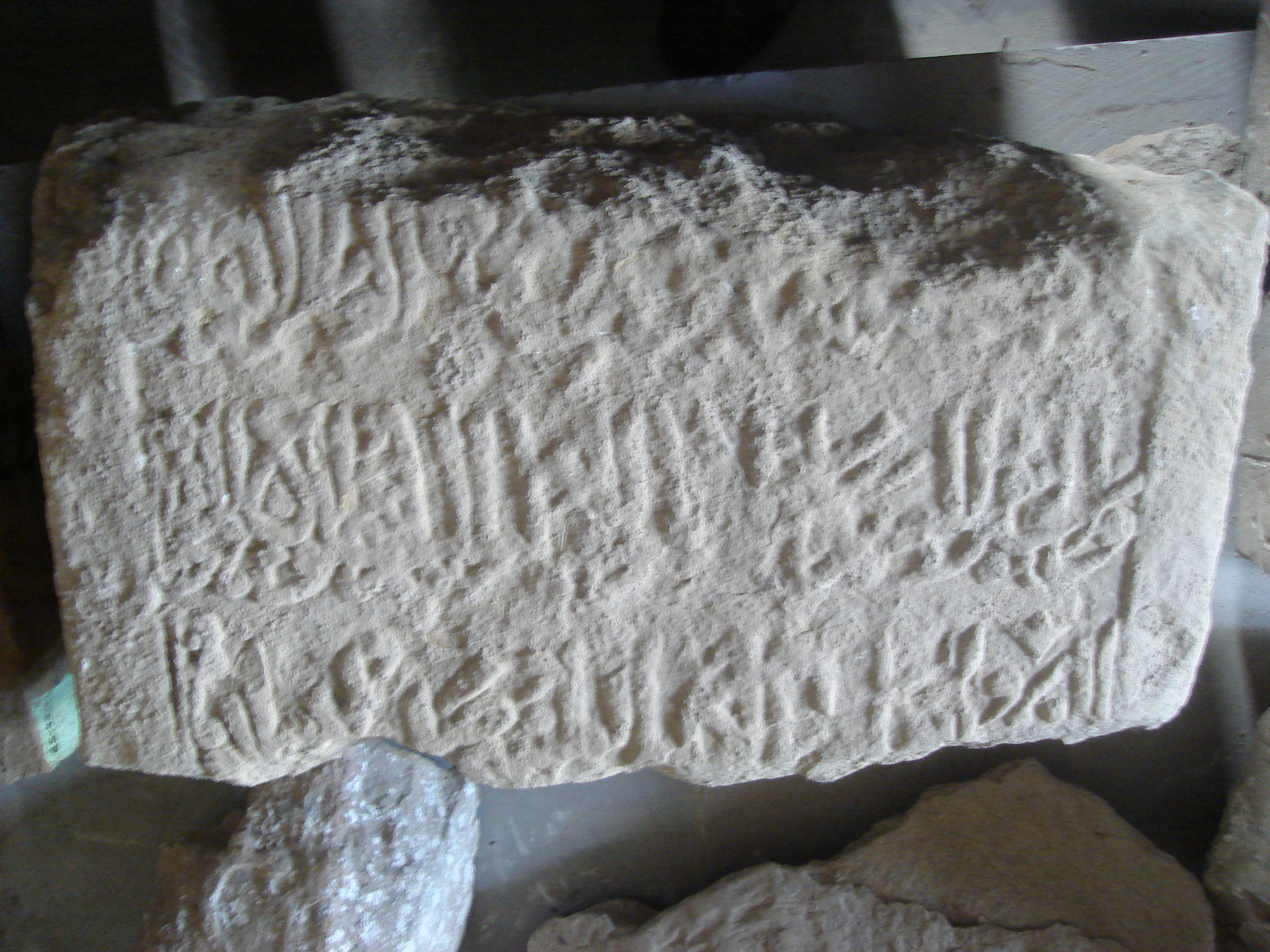
A gravestone written in the Bolghar language (amongst the Turkic Languages) with Arabic transcript

The Tatars refer to the medieval capital of Volga Bolgaria as Shahri Bolghar (Tatar: Шәһри Болгар), that is Persian for "the City of Bolghar". The town is part of their cultural heritage, because Volga Bulgaria is the predecessor state of the Khanate of Kazan, which in turn is in a way the predecessor of today's Russian republic of Tatarstan.

Today, the capital of Tatarstan is Kazan, but many Tatars consider Bolghar to be their ancient and religious capital and to allow a glimpse of Muslim Bulgar life before the Mongol invasion of Volga Bulgaria.

== Sources ==
- Bukharaev, Ravil (3 June 2014). Islam in Russia: The Four Seasons. Routledge. ISBN 978-1-136-80793-0.
- Curta, Florin (8 July 2019). Eastern Europe in the Middle Ages (500-1300) (2 vols). BRILL. ISBN 978-90-04-39519-0.
- Halperin, Charles J. (1987). Russia and the Golden Horde: The Mongol Impact on Medieval Russian History. p. 222. ISBN 9781850430575. (e-book).
- Turnerelli, Edward Tracy, Kazan, the Ancient Capital of the Tartar Khans, 1854, pp 196–261
