= Bulgarian Islamic Academy =

Coordinates: 54°57′47″N 49°03′45″E

Bolgar Islamic Academy
- Russian: Болгарская исламская академия Tatar: Болгар ислам академиясе
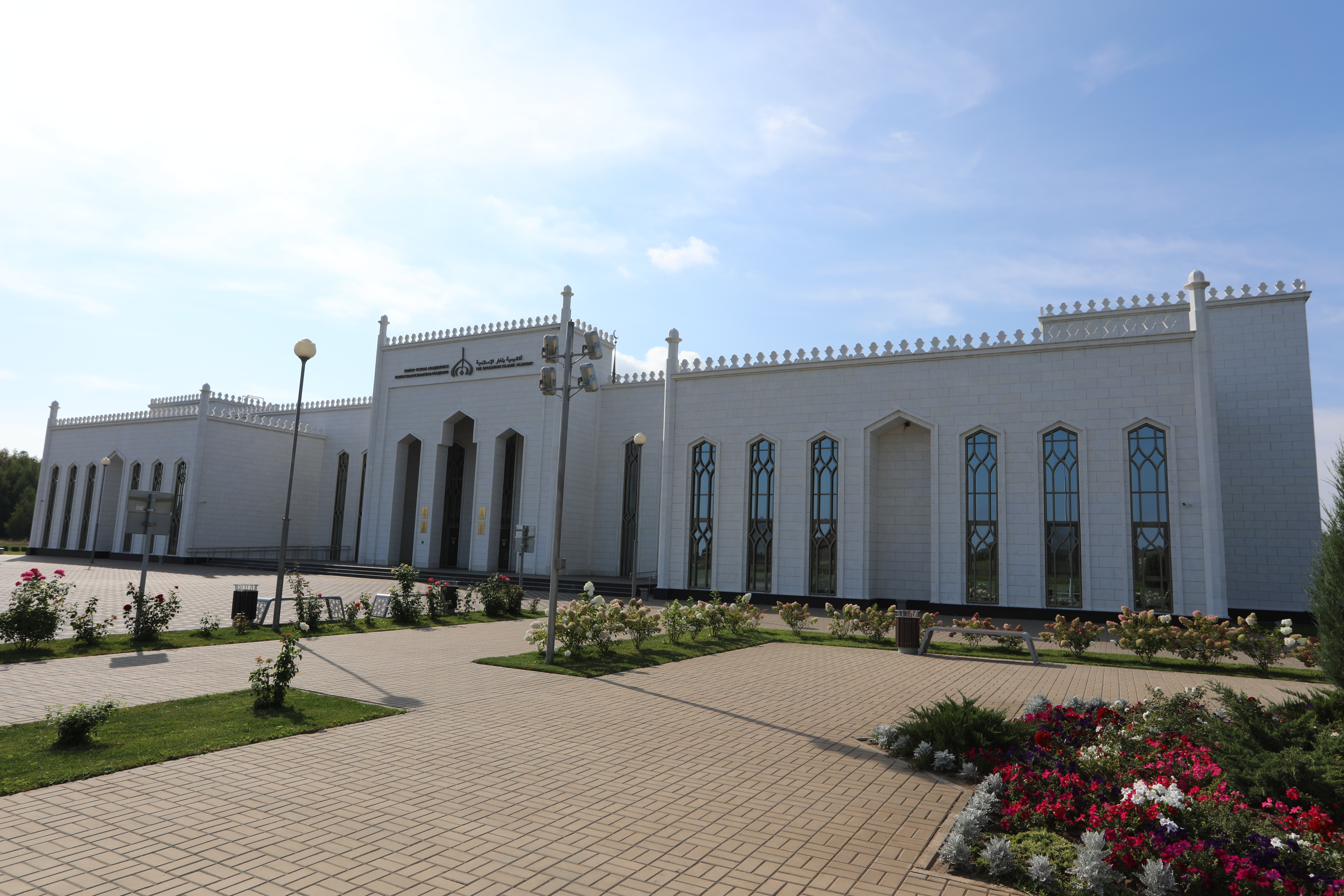
- Type: theological
- Established: 2017
- Rector: Ainur Timerkhanov
- Location: 1A Qol Ghali, Bolgar, Tatarstan, Russia
- Website: bolgar.academy

The Bolgar Islamic Academy (Russian: Болгарская исламская академия, Tatar: Болгар ислам академиясе, romanized: Bolğar islam aqädemiyäse) is a theological islamic instite in Bolgar, Tatarstan, Russia.

== History ==
In November 2015, the President of Tatarstan Rustam Minnikhanov signed a decree on the establishment of the Bulgarian Islamic Academy. It's stated the creation of a domestic Islamic theological school is the main purpose. The creation of the academy was supported by the President of the Russian Federation Vladimir Putin.

On May 21, 2016, on the day of the adoption of Islam by Volga Bulgaria, a solemn ceremony of laying a memorial stone in the foundation of the educational and residential complex of the academy took place. On May 20, 2017, the construction of educational and residential and 6 bedroom buildings for teachers and students was completed.

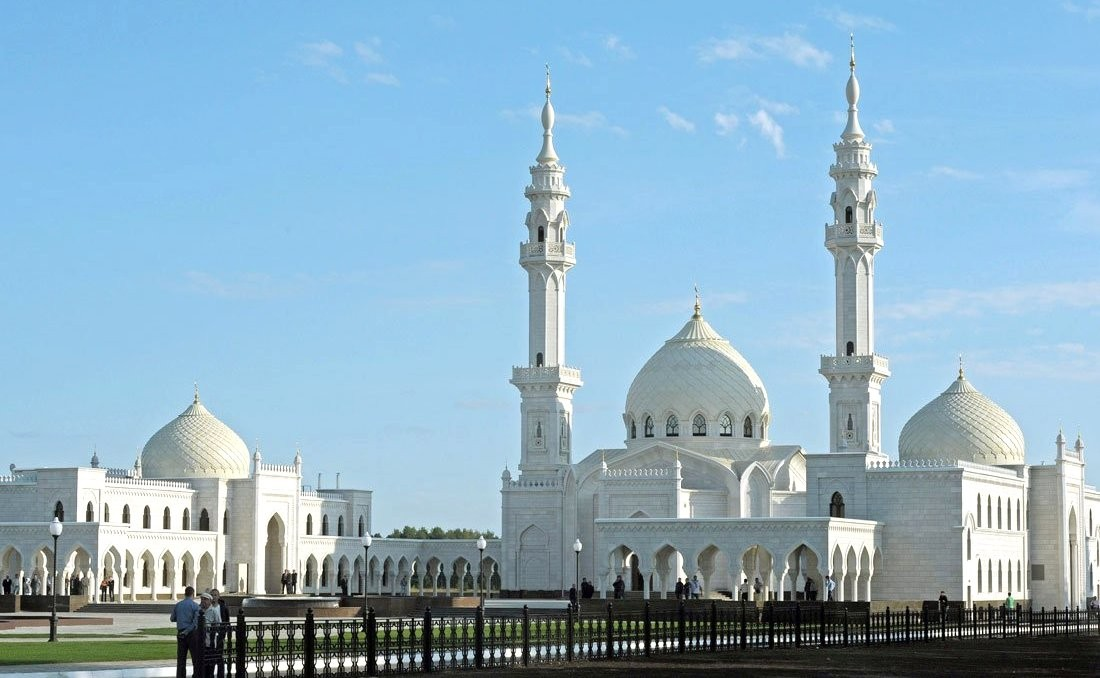
White Mosque complex in Bolgar

In July 2017, the White Mosque complex, consisting of a mosque, a madrasah and a residence, was attached to the academy.

On September 4, 2017, the opening of the institution took place.

== Education ==
Due to the acute shortage of highly qualified teachers with higher Islamic education, foreign theologians were invited to work at the Bulgarian Islamic Academy: from Jordan, Egypt, Morocco and Syria. At first, the teaching took place in Arabic.

Much attention is paid to the study of the Tatar and Old Tatar languages.

The academy trains masters and doctors of Islamic Sciences. From 2020 The academy also trains specialists in the "Theology".

In the 2021/2022 academic year, 22 teachers take part in the implementation of educational programs, 5 of them are foreign.

== International cooperation ==
The academy has cooperation agreements with a number of foreign educational institutions and scientific and public organizations.

State	City	Organization
Azerbaijan	Baku	Theology Institute of Azerbaijan
Azerbaijan	Baku	Idrak Public Association
France	Paris	Faculty of Islamic Sciences
India	Deoband	Darul Uloom Deoband
Jordan	Mafraq	Al al-Bayt University
Kazakhstan	Almaty	Nur-Mubarak University
Kyrgyzstan	Bishkek	Islamic University of Kyrgyzstan
Morocco	Tétouan and Tangier	Abdelmalek Essaâdi University
Syria	Damascus	Damascus University
United Arab Emirates	Abu Dhabi	World Council of Muslim Communities
United Arab Emirates	Abu Dhabi	Mohammed V University
United Arab Emirates	Sharjah	University of Sharjah
Uzbekistan	Tashkent	International Islamic Academy of Uzbekistan
Uzbekistan	Tashkent	Tashkent Islamic Institute
Uzbekistan	Tashkent	Imam Bukhari Research Center
