= Bolgar, Spassky District, Republic of Tatarstan =

Town in the Republic of Tatarstan, Russia

Bolgar Болгар
- Town

Other transcription(s)
  - Tatar: Болгар
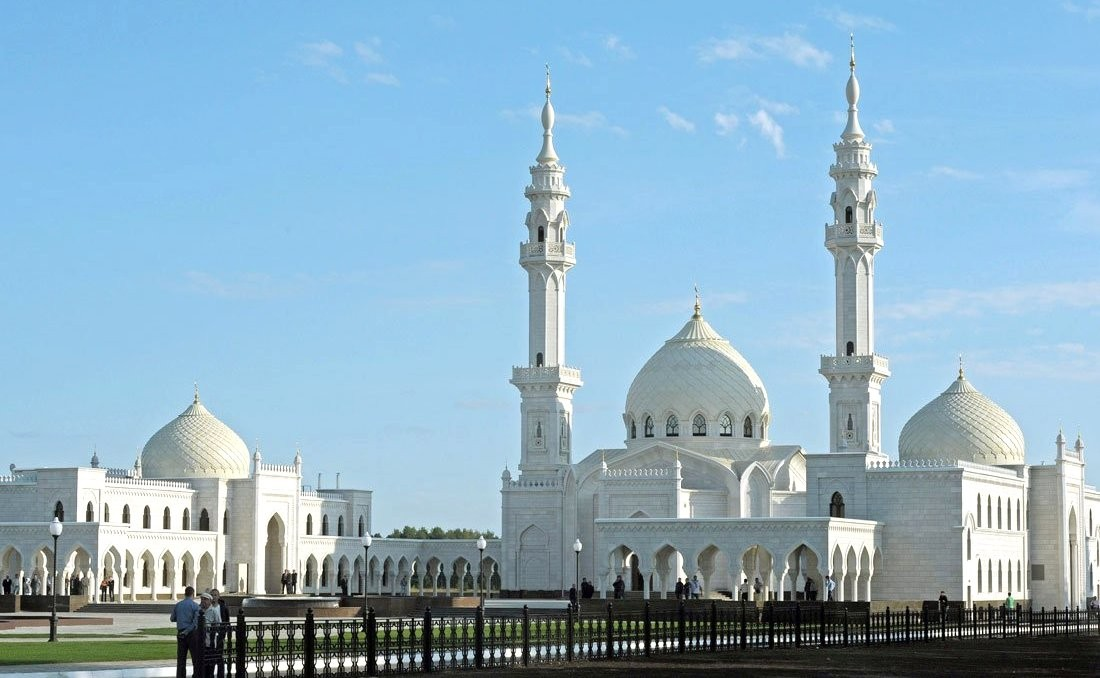
- Bolgar mosque

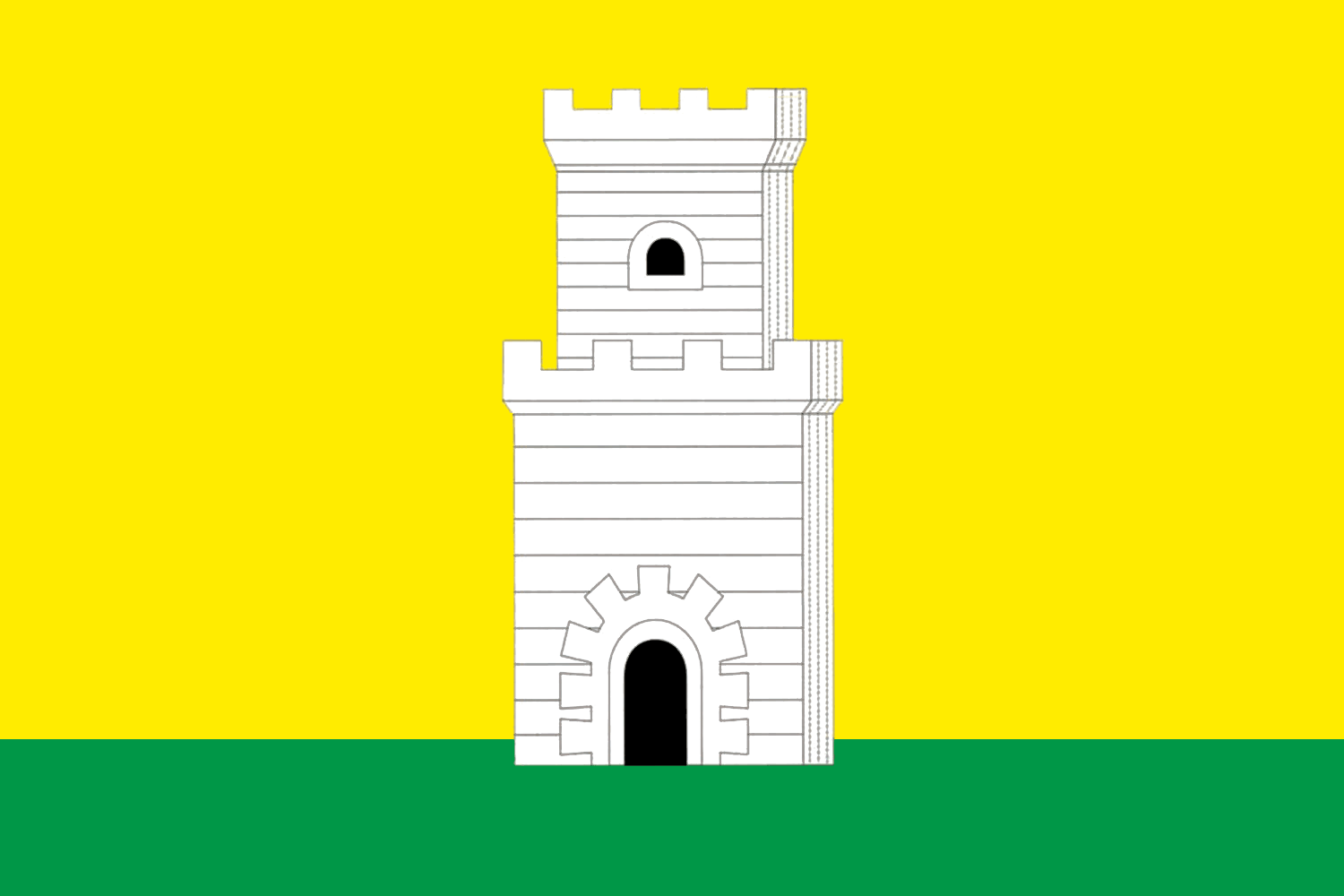
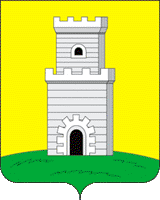
- Flag Coat of arms
- Interactive map of Bolgar
- Location of Bolgar Bolgar (Tatarstan)
- Coordinates: 54°58′27″N 49°01′51″E
- Country: Russia
- Federal subject: Tatarstan
- Administrative district: Spassky District
- Founded: 1781

Area
  - Total: 8.0 km^{2} (3.1 sq mi)
- Elevation: 80 m (260 ft)

Population (2010 Census)
  - Total: 8,650
  - Estimate (2021): 8,285 (−4.2%)
  - Density: 1,100/km^{2} (2,800/sq mi)

Administrative status
  - Capital of: Spassky District

Municipal status
  - Municipal district: Spassky Municipal District
  - Urban settlement: Bolgar Urban Settlement
  - Capital of: Spassky Municipal District, Bolgar Urban Settlement
- Time zone: UTC+3 (MSK)
- Postal codes: 422840, 422869
- Dialing code: +7 84347
- OKTMO ID: 92632101001
- Website: spasskiy.tatarstan.ru/rus/mo-gorod-bolgar.htm

Bolgar (Russian: Болгар; Tatar: Болгар) is a town and the administrative center of Spassky District in the Republic of Tatarstan, Russia, located on the left bank of the Volga River, 140 kilometers (87 mi) from Kazan. As of the 2010 Census, its population was 8,650.

It was previously known as Spassk (until 1926), Spassk-Tatarsky (until 1935), Kuybyshev (until 1991).

== History ==
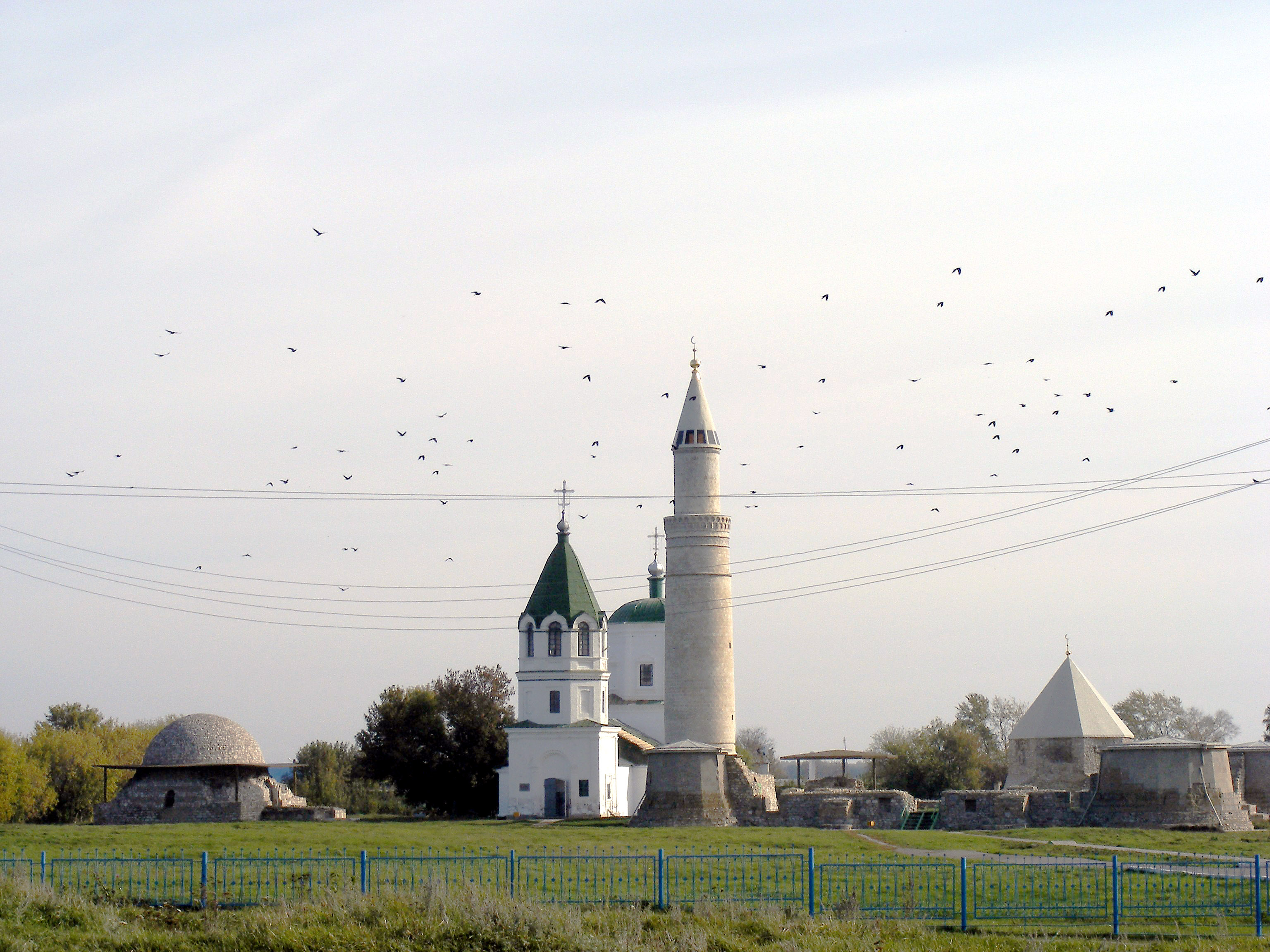
View to the Bolgar Historical and Archaeological Complex before the implementation of the complex programme

The excavated monuments of Bolghar, the medieval capital of Volga Bulgaria, are within easy reach from the town. The modern town of Spassk (Спасск) was formed from the village of Spassk (Chertykovo) on the bank of Bezdna River in 1781. It was renamed Spassk-Tatarsky (Спасск-Татарский) in 1926, then Kuybyshev Куйбышев), in honor of Valerian Kuybyshev, in 1935, before getting its present name in 1991. It served as a district administrative center since 1930.

In 1957, due to the construction of Kuybyshev Reservoir and flooding of the original Spassk, the town was moved from the place of its foundation closer to historical Bolgar.

In 1991, the town changed its name to Bolgar in honor of the remains of the medieval city of Bolghar (Bolgar Historical and Archaeological Complex) located nearby.

Since 2010, on the initiative and the supervision of the first president of the Republic of Tatarstan Mintimer Shaimiev, the complex programme 'Cultural Heritage - Island-Town of Sviyazhsk and Ancient Bolgar' has been implemented in Bolgar. The programme involves the conservation of architectural and archaeological heritage of Bolgar and the development of its touristic infrastructure. The programme has the following results:

- Key architectural monuments as Small Minaret, Cathedral Mosque, Khan's Shrine, Eastern Mausoleum, Northern Mausoleum, Eastern Chamber, Assumption Church were conserved;
- Key archaeological ruins as Khan's Palace, Bath No2, Pottery Kilns were conserved;
- Tourism and research infrastructure, including a River Station with the Museum of Bulgarian Civilization, Memorial Sign in honor of the adoption of Islam in the Volga Bulgaria, White Mosque, Healer's House and Crafts Workshops, International Centre for Archaeological Research, International Archaeological School, Museum of Bread, were constructed;
- New museum expositions, including an Open-Air Museum on Turkic-Tatar Writing and Medieval Crafts of the City of Bolgar Ground were created;
- Several houses on Nazarovykh and Mukhamedyara Streets were conserved, which are currently re-used as a cafe and museums;
- Volga Riverside from the River station to the Saint Abraham's Well was improved and enhanced with interactive education facilities on Bolgar heritage.

== Administrative and municipal status ==
Within the framework of administrative divisions, Bolgar serves as the administrative center of Spassky District, to which it is directly subordinated. As a municipal division, the town of Bolgar, together with the selo of Bolgary, is incorporated within Spassky Municipal District as Bolgar Urban Settlement.

== Economy ==
As of 1997, the town's industrial enterprises included a meat factory, a bakery, a brewery, a clothing factory, and a forestry farm. The nearest railway station is Cherdakly on the Ulyanovsk–Ufa line, 71 kilometers (44 mi) south of Bolgar.

Since 2010, the tourism flow to Bolgar has increased about 20 times: in 2010 Bolgar was visited by 50 000 tourists, in 2018 the annual visitation number has reached 541 000. In 2016, Bolgar became the most popular touristic towns of Russia.

== Demographics ==
Bolgar population
- 2010 Census: 8,650
- 2002 Census: 8,655
- 1989 Census: 8,397
- 1979 Census: 8,383

As of 1989, the population was ethnically mostly Russian (83.4%), Tatar (12.9%), and Chuvash (2.1%).

As of 2018, the town is on the 989 place from 1113 cities and towns of the Russian Federation in terms of the number of its inhabitants.

== Attractions ==
The town is bordering the Bolgar Historical and Archaeological Complex World Heritage site. The property was inscribed to the World Heritage List in 2014 in accordance with criteria (ii) and (vi). Its architectural and archaeological heritage is considered evidence of the medieval city of Bolgar, which existed in the 7-15th centuries as a key political centre of the Volga Bulgaria and the first capital of the Golden Horde. The property also has a significant religious value as a symbolic place of the adoption of Islam by the Volga Bulgaria in 922 and serves as a pilgrimage place for Tatar Muslims. The following historic monuments are located in the complex:

- Northern Mausoluem
- Eastern Mausoleum
- Cathedral Mosque
- Big Minaret (Reconstruction)
- Assumption Church (currently operates as the Museum of the History of the Assumption Church)
- Small Minaret and Khan's Shrine
- Khan's Palace
- Black Chamber
- Eastern Chamber
- White Chamber
- Bath House No 2
- Bath House No 3
- Red Chamber

The Bolgar Historical and Archaeological Complex is managed by the Bolgar State Historical and Architectural Museum-Reserve, which museums are located inside of the property:

- Museum of the Bulgarian Civilization
- Quran Museum (Memorial Sign in honor of adoption of Islam by the Volga Bulgaria)
- Healer's House Museum
- Museum of the History of the Assumption Church
- Turkic-Tatar Writing Open Air Museum
- Bolgar Tea Party Museum
- Town on a River Museum
- Museum of the Nobility of Spassky Uyezd
- Abdulla Alish Museum
- Interactive Historic Riverside
- Saint Abraham's Well

There are several attractions located close to the Bolgar Historical and Archaeological Complex:

- Museum of Bread
- Small Town
- Camel Farm
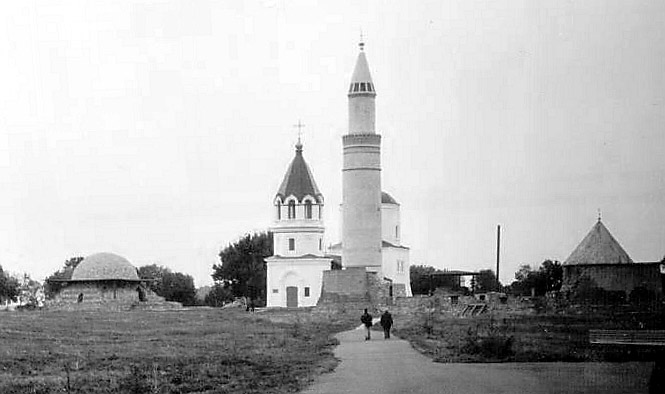
  Bolgar Historical and Archaeological Complex in the mid-20th century
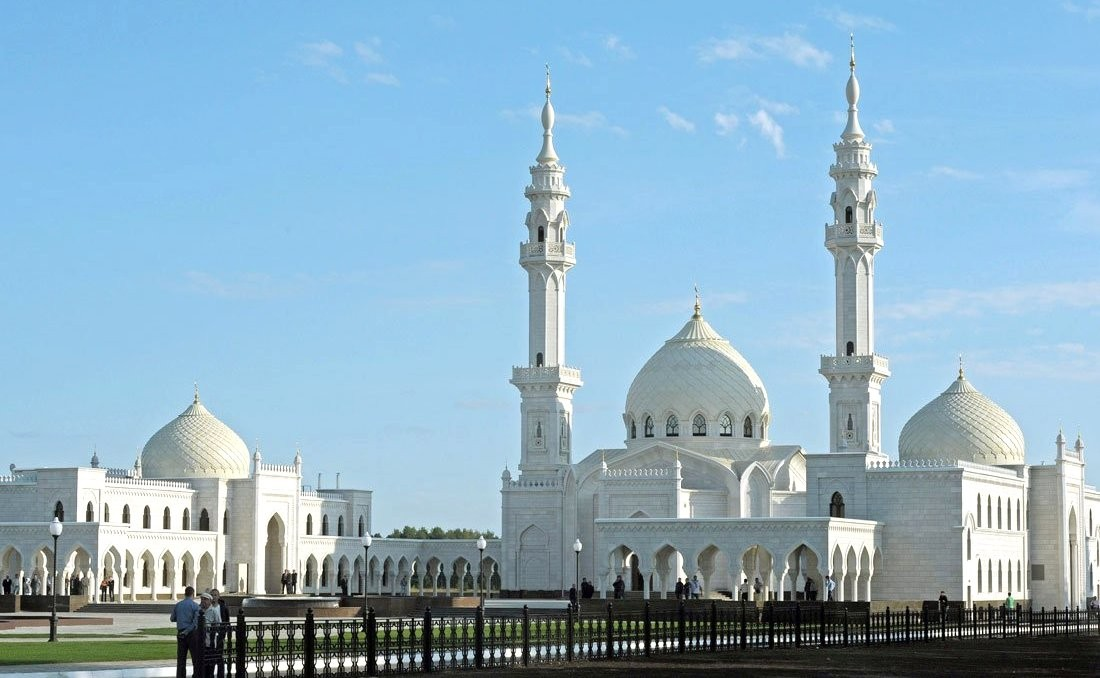
  White Mosque
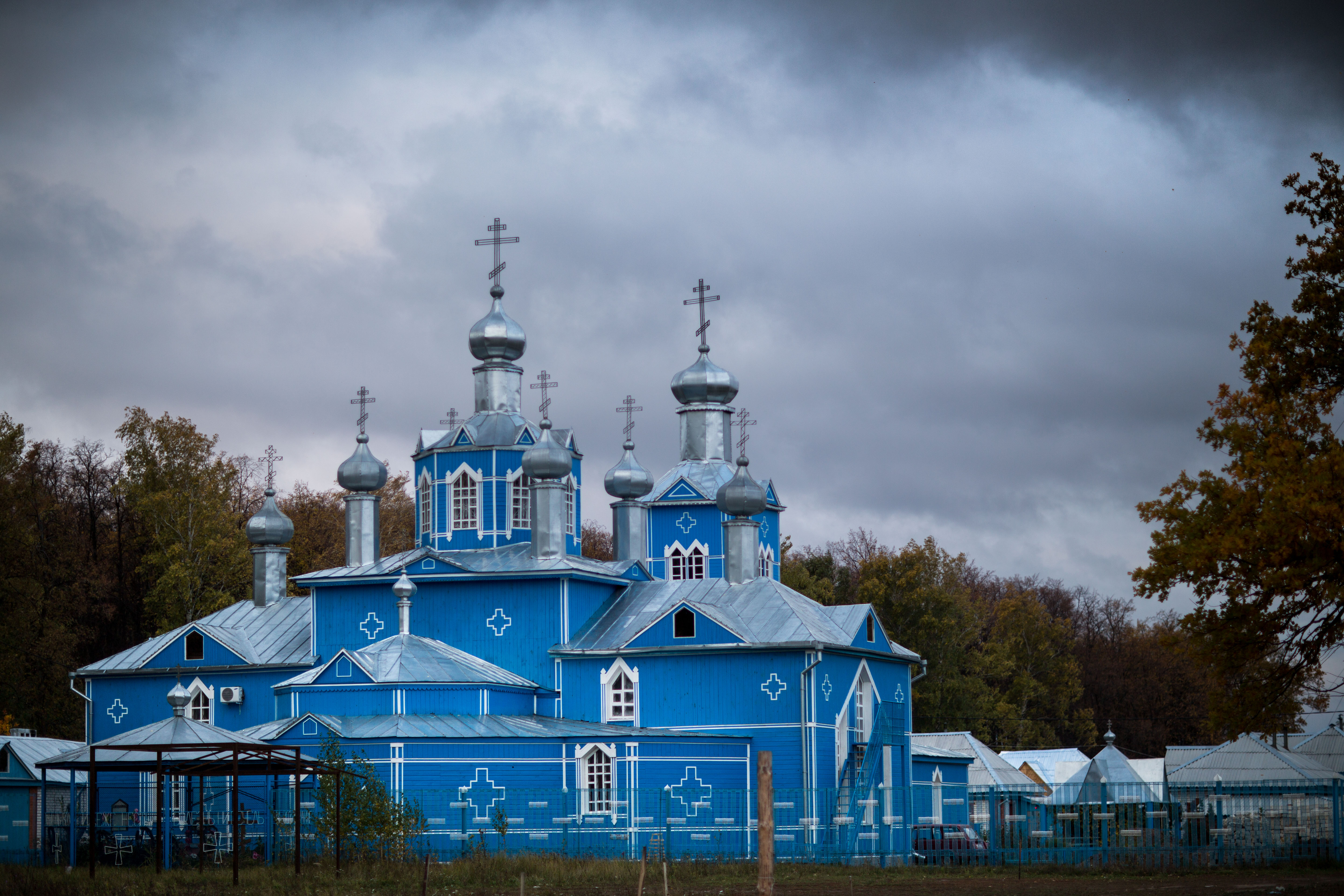
  Saint Abraham Church in the town of Bolgar
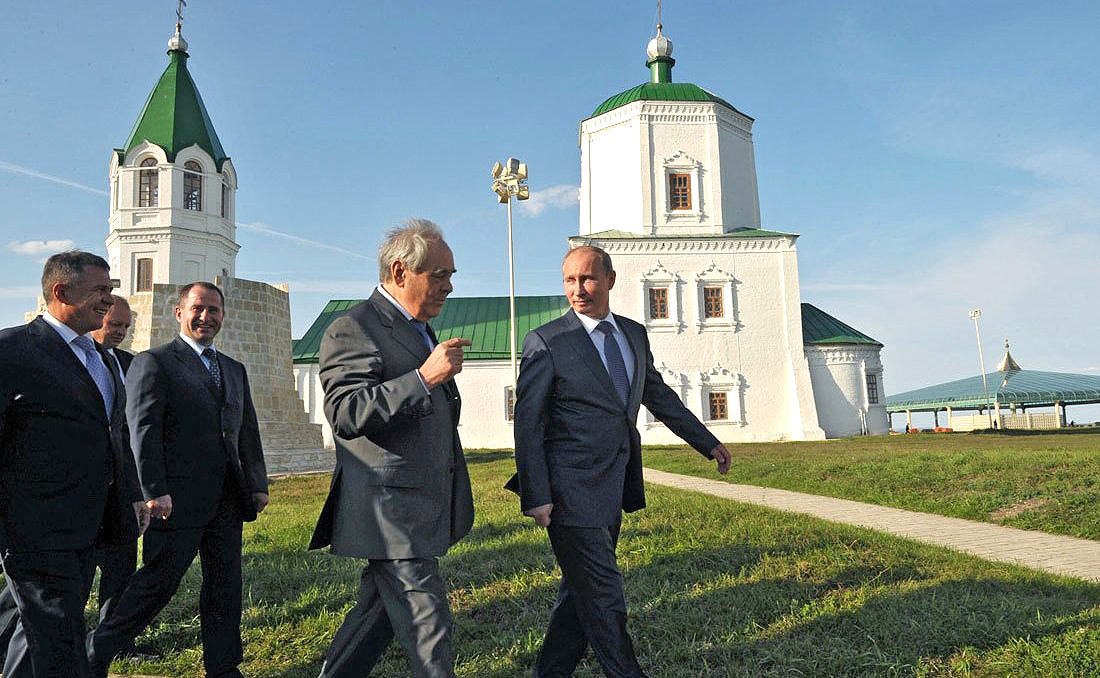
  The visit of the President of Russian Federation Vladimir Putin to Bolgar in 2012
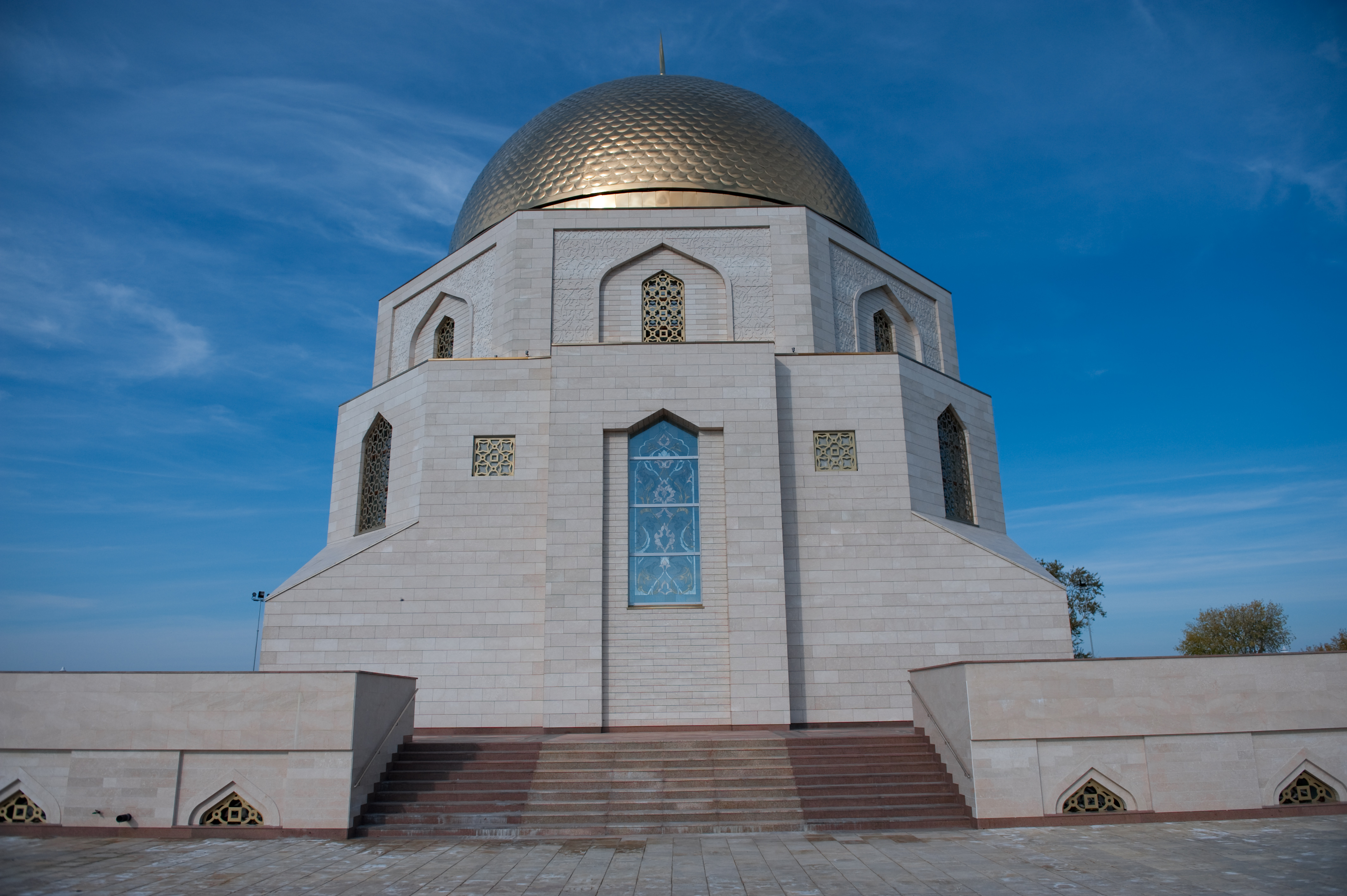
  Memorial Sign in honor of the adoption of Islam by the Volga Bulgaria in 922
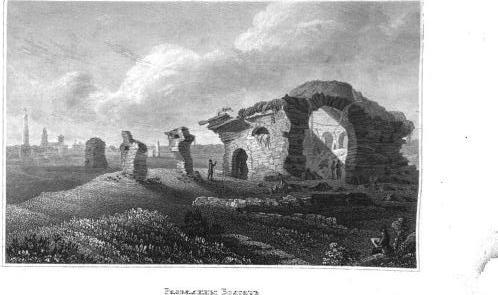
  The ruins of the medieval city of Bolgar (1839)
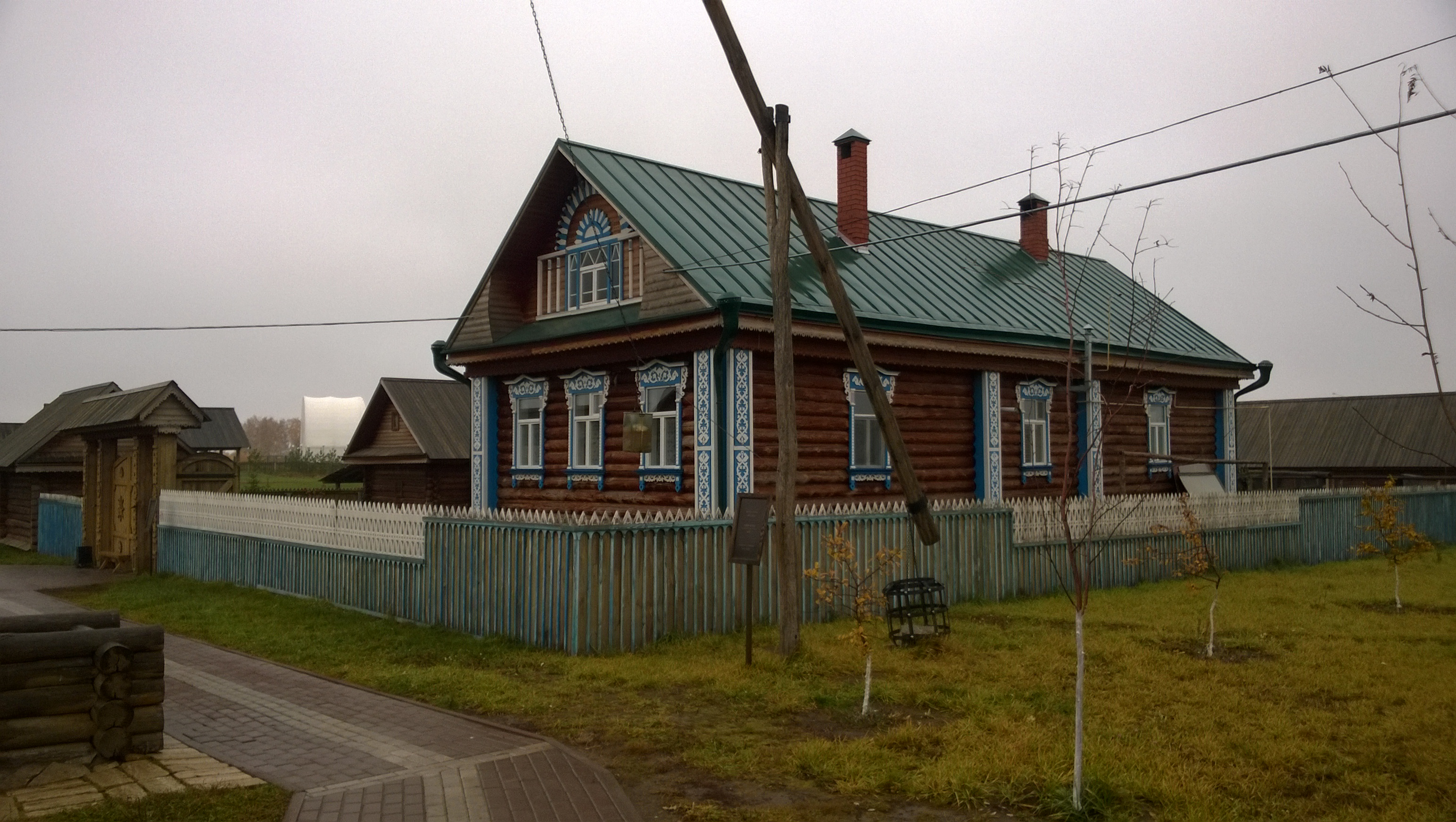
  Museum of Bread
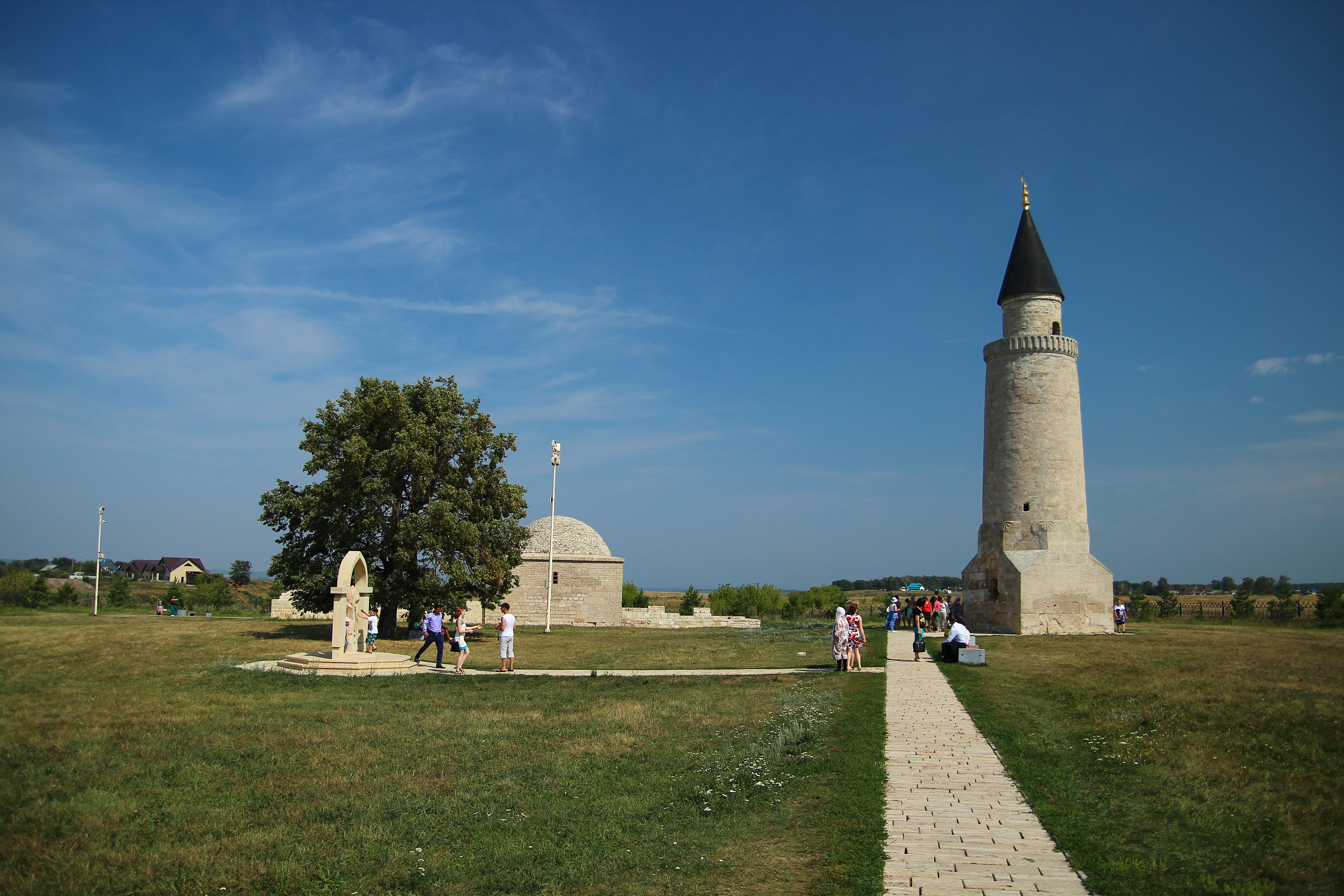
  Small Minaret, Khan's Shrine and Sahabah Memorial
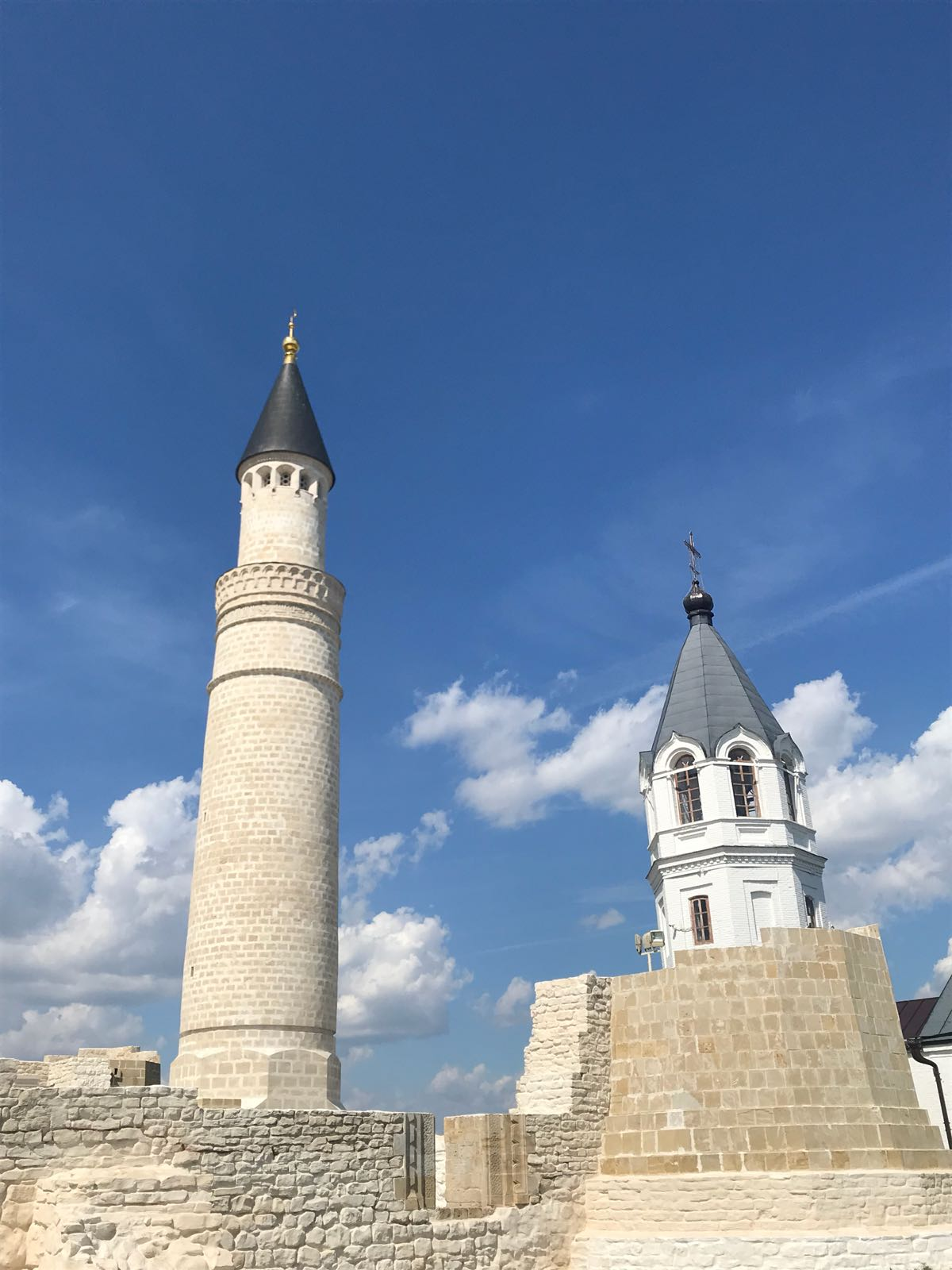
  The ruins of the Cathedral Mosque, the Big Minaret and the Assumption Church
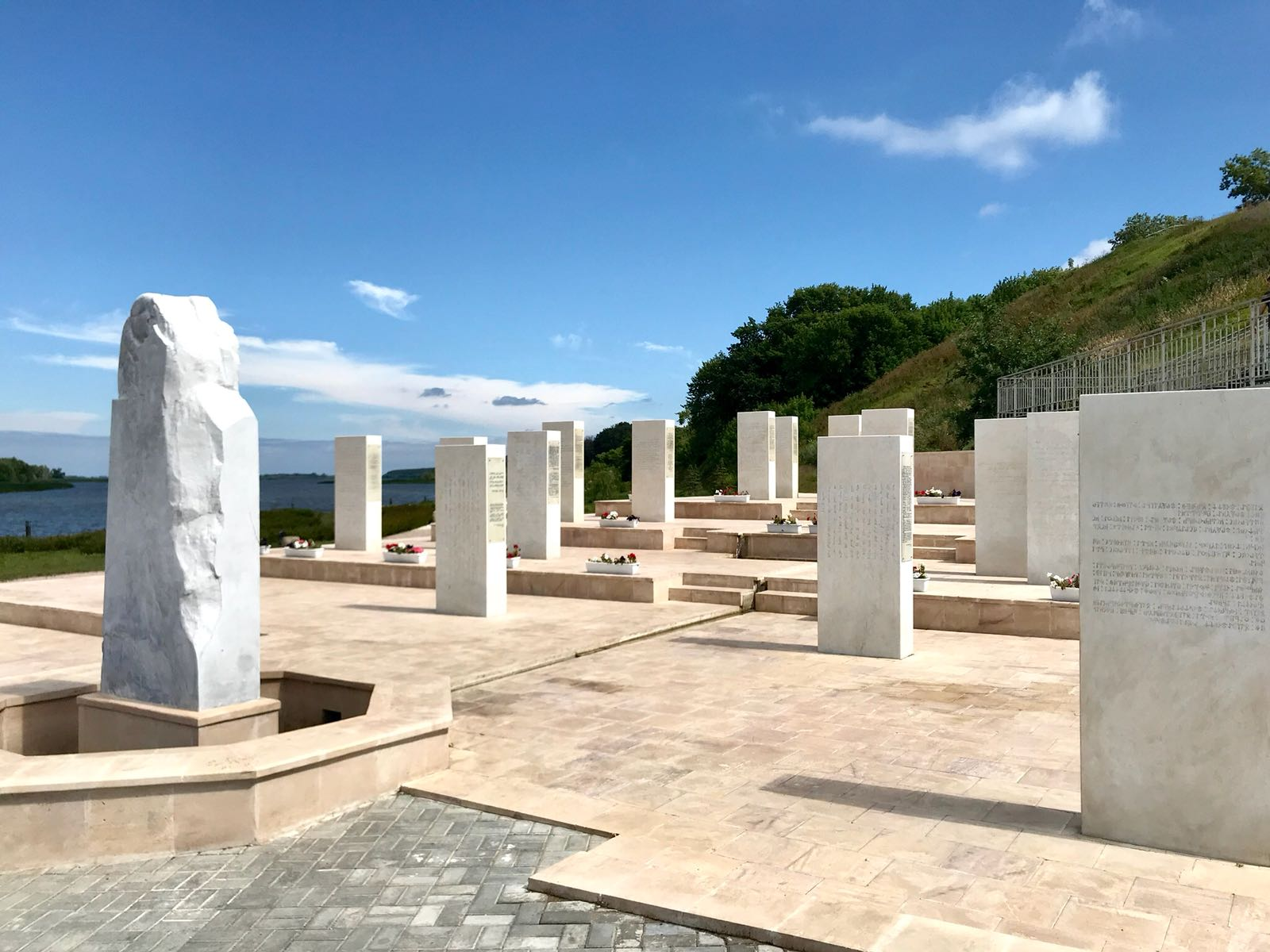
  Turkic-Tatar Writing History Open Air Museum
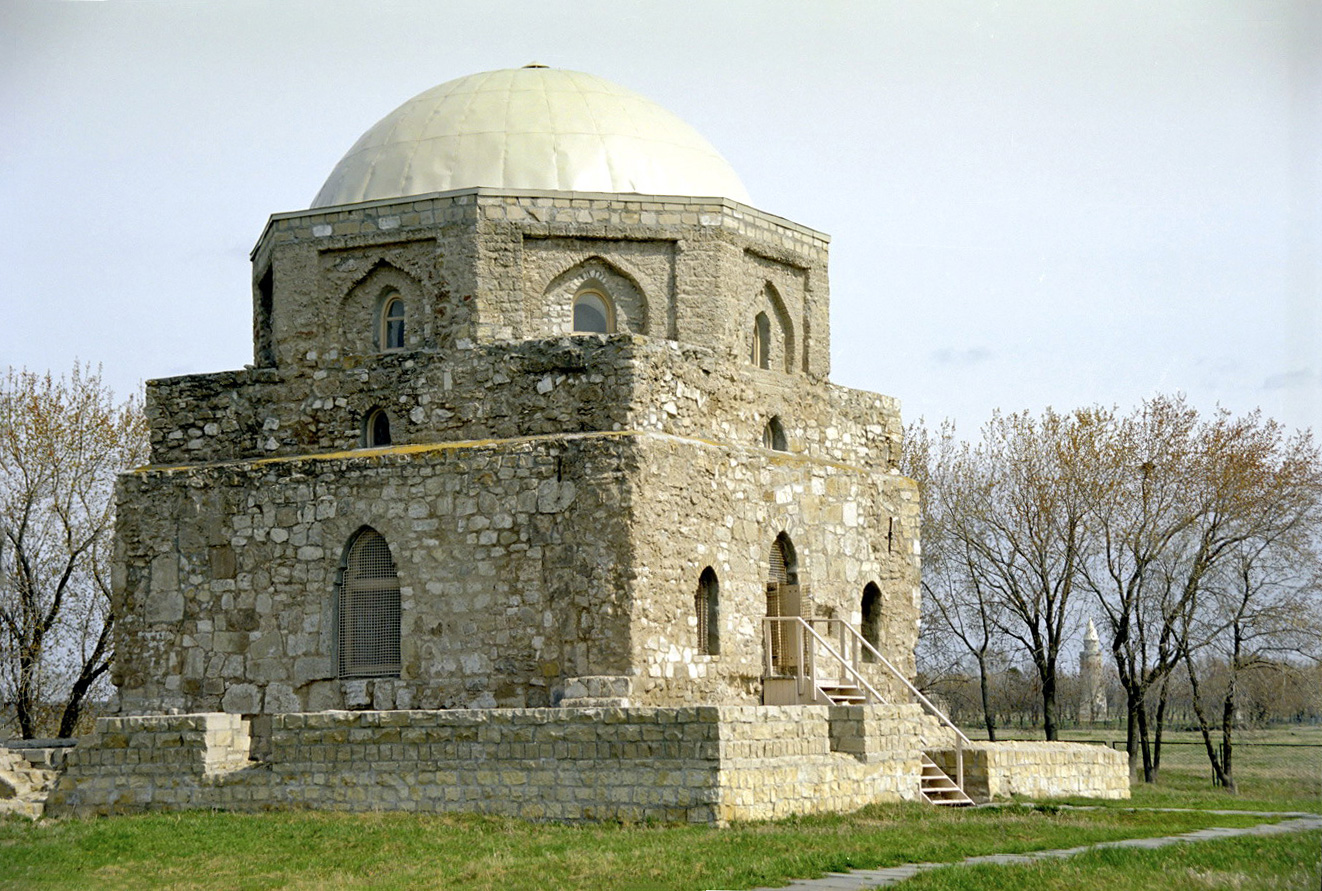
  Black Chamber
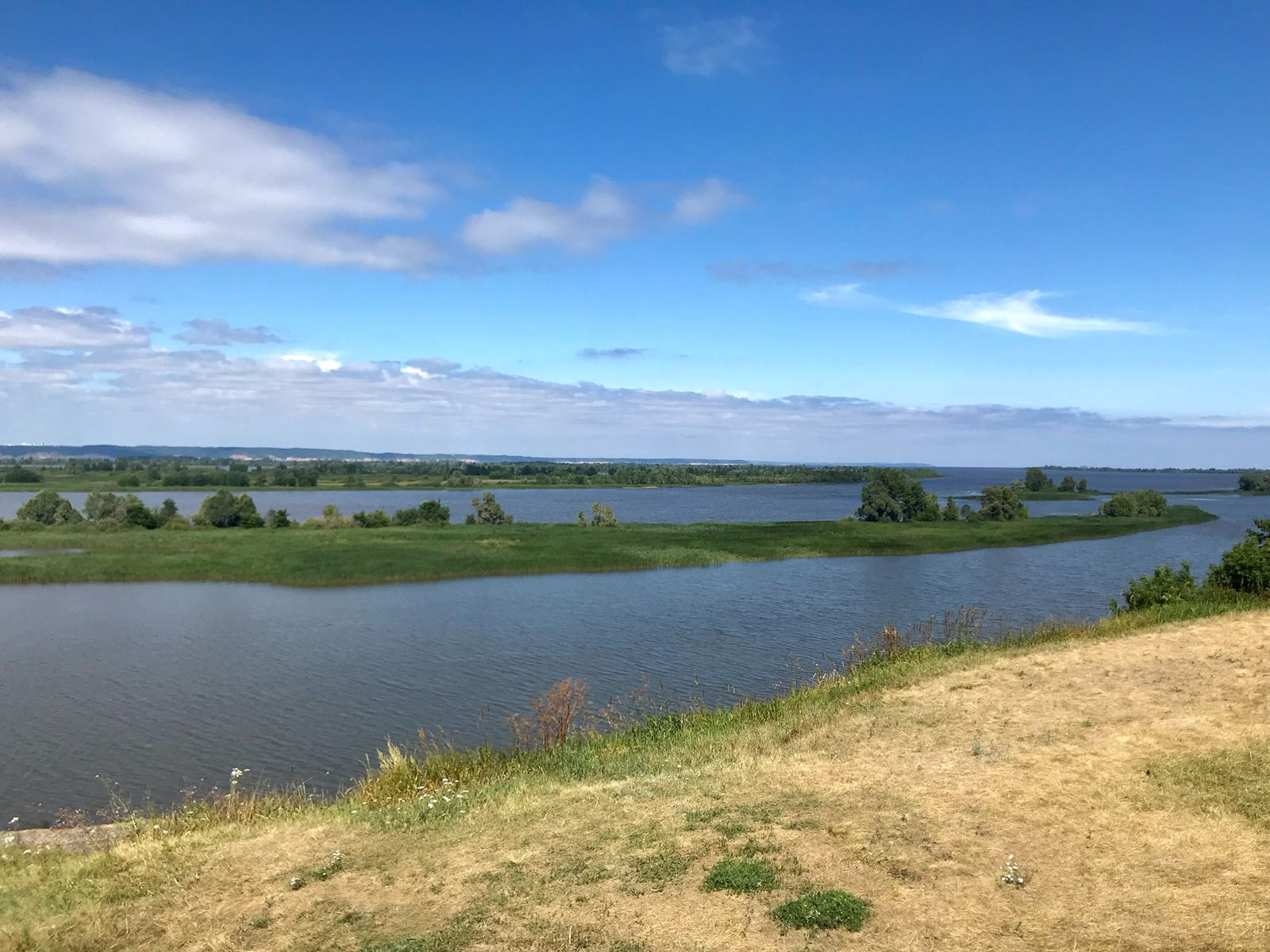
  Volga Riverside in Bolgar
