= 1845 in literature =

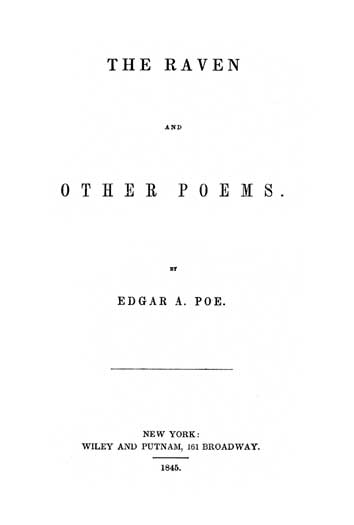
"The Raven" title page.

This article contains information about the literary events and publications of 1845.

== Events ==
- January 10 – Robert Browning begins his correspondence with his future wife, fellow poet Elizabeth Barrett. On May 20 they meet for the first time. She begins writing her Sonnets from the Portuguese.
- January 29 – Edgar Allan Poe first publishes the narrative poem "The Raven", under his own name in The Evening Mirror of New York City, of which he is a staff critic until February. Following this publication the poem appeared in periodicals across the United States, including the New York Tribune (February 4, 1845), Broadway Journal (vol. 1, February 8, 1845), Southern Literary Messenger (vol. 11, March 1845), Literary Emporium (vol. 2, December 1845), Saturday Courier, 16 (July 25, 1846), and the Richmond Examiner (September 25, 1849). The immediate success of "The Raven" prompted Wiley and Putnam to publish a collection of Poe's prose called Tales in June 1845; it was his first book in five years. They also published a collection of his poetry called The Raven and Other Poems on November 19, which was the first time that the poem was collected and which included a dedication to Elizabeth Barrett as "the Noblest of her Sex".
- March – Walt Whitman publishes a short story, "Arrow-Tip" (later renamed "The Half-Breed"). Whitman wrote The Half-Breed; A Tale of the Western Frontier during the lead up to the Mexican–American War (1846–1848), while he was editor of the Brooklyn Daily Eagle. Throughout his works, Whitman alludes to Native Americans and contributes to the "vanishing Indian" trope.In The Half-Breed, Whitman reportedly "lapses into the stock racial profile of an 'apathetic' and expressionless Native American." Otherwise the story is notable for Whitman's argument against capital punishment. In the story, the character Arrow-Tip is wrongfully executed, he "dies as a result of mistaken testimony, revenge, and a precipitant legal hanging."
- April – Nathaniel Hawthorne first publishes the short story "P.'s Correspondence", a pioneering example of alternate history, in which deceased writers and political figures (such as Keats, Shelley and Byron) are described as still living, and vice versa. The story appears in The United States Magazine and Democratic Review and features in Hawthorne's Mosses from an Old Manse (1846).
- April 24 – Alfred de Musset and Honoré de Balzac are awarded the French Legion of Honour.
- c. May – Benjamin Disraeli's "Young England" roman à thèse, Sybil; or, The Two Nations, is published in London; he receives a £10,000 advance.
- Spring–Summer – The essays in Thomas de Quincey's Suspiria de Profundis appear in Blackwood's Magazine.
- October 1 – Prosper Mérimée's novella Carmen appears in its original form in Revue des deux Mondes. Book publication follows in 1846.
- December – The future American President Brevet Second Lieutenant Ulysses S. Grant plays Desdemona in an amateur production of Othello at Corpus Christi, Texas.
- December 30 – The American actress Charlotte Cushman plays Romeo to her sister Susan's Juliet in a production of Romeo and Juliet at the Haymarket Theatre in London which revives Shakespeare's original text and ending.
- undated
  - In Stuttgart, Kingdom of Württemberg, the agronomist Arthur Schott begins putting out chapbooks with samples from Romanian folklore; these feature the first recorded mentions of a trickster-like figure, Păcală (as Bakála).
  - Varney the Vampire; or, the Feast of Blood begins serial publication as a 'penny dreadful' by Edward Lloyd in London, introducing many of the tropes of vampire fiction. It is probably written by James Malcolm Rymer and Thomas Preskett Prest.

== New books ==
=== Fiction ===
- James Fenimore Cooper
  - The Chainbearer
  - Satanstoe
- Charles Dickens – The Cricket on the Hearth
- Benjamin Disraeli – Sybil
- Alexandre Dumas, père
  - Le Chevalier de Maison-Rouge
  - The Corsican Brothers
  - The Count of Monte Cristo (book publication concluded)
  - The Regent's Daughter
  - La Reine Margot
  - Twenty Years After
- József Eötvös – A falu jegyzője (The Village Notary)
- Catherine Gore – The Snowstorm: A Christmas Story
- Nathaniel Hawthorne – P.'s Correspondence
- Geraldine Jewsbury – Zoe, A History of Two Lives
- Joaquim Manuel de Macedo – O moço loiro
- Frederick Marryat – The Mission, or Scenes in Africa
- Prosper Mérimée – Carmen
- J. M. Rymer – Ada the Betrayed; or, The Murder at the Old Smithy
- Arthur Schott – Bakála cycle
- Adele Schopenhauer – Anna: Ein Roman aus der nächsten Vergangenheit (Anna: a novel of the recent past)
- William Sewell – Hawkstone: a tale of and for England
- Robert Smith Surtees – Hillingdon Hall

=== Children ===
- Hans Christian Andersen – New Fairy Tales. First Volume. Third Collection (Nye Eventyr. Første Bind. Tredie Samling) comprising "The Elf Mound" ("Elverhøi"), "The Red Shoes" ("De røde Skoe"), "The Jumpers" ("Springfyrene"), "The Shepherdess and the Chimney Sweep" ("Hyrdinden og Skorstensfejeren") and "Holger Danske"
- Ludwig Bechstein – Deutsches Märchenbuch (German Fairy-Tale Book)
- Heinrich Hoffmann – Der Struwwelpeter (Shock-headed Peter, original title: Lustige Geschichten und drollige Bilder mit 15 schön kolorierten Tafeln für Kinder von 3–6 Jahren, in verse)

=== Drama ===
- Juan Eugenio Hartzenbusch – La Jura en Santa Gadea
- Henrik Hertz – King René's Daughter (Kong Renés Datter)
- Anna Cora Mowatt – Fashion; or, Life in New York: a comedy
- Martins Pena – first performances
  - As Casadas Solteiras
  - O caixeiro da taverna
  - O diletante
  - O Noviço
  - Os dois ou O inglês maquinista
  - Os três médicos
- José Zorrilla – Traidor, inconfeso y mártir

=== Poetry ===
- Edgar Allan Poe – "The Raven"

=== Non-fiction ===
- Eliza Acton – Modern Cookery for Private Families
- Jules Barbey d'Aurevilly – On Dandyism and George Brummell (Du dandyism et de George Brummell)
- Thomas Carlyle – Oliver Cromwell's Letters and Speeches
- Frederick Douglass – Narrative of the Life of Frederick Douglass, an American Slave
- Encyclopædia Metropolitana
- Friedrich Engels – The Condition of the Working Class in England (Die Lage der arbeitenden Klasse in England)
- Richard Ford – A Hand-Book for Travellers in Spain, and readers at home
- Margaret Fuller – Woman in the Nineteenth Century (book publication)
- François-Xavier Garneau – Histoire du Canada, vol. 1
- Owen Jones – Book of Common Prayer (1845 illuminated version)
- Justinus Kerner – The Seeress of Prévorst: being revelations concerning the inner-life of man, and the inter-diffusion of a world of spirits in the one we inhabit (translated by Catherine Crowe)
- Søren Kierkegaard – Stages on Life's Way (Stadier paa Livets Vej)
- Domingo Sarmiento – Facundo (Civilización y Barbarie: vida de Juan Facundo Qiroga)
- Max Stirner – The Ego and Its Own (Der Einzige und sein Eigentum, dated 1844)

== Births ==
- January 8 – Minnie Willis Baines, American author (died 1923)
- January 21 – Lepha Eliza Bailey, American author, lecturer and social reformer (died 1924)
- March 21 – Emily Thornton Charles, American poet, journalist, editor and newspaper founder (died 1895)
- April 4 – Emma B. Alrich, American journalist, author and educator (died 1925)
- April 17 – Lucy Bethia Walford, Scottish novelist and artist (died 1915)
- April 24 – Carl Spitteler, Swiss poet (died 1924)
- April 30 – Alexander Anderson, Scottish poet (died 1909)
- May 9 – Georgina Castle Smith (pseudonym Brenda), English children's writer (died 1933)
- May 14 – L. S. Bevington, English anarchist poet and essayist (died 1895)
- May 16 – Amy Dillwyn, Welsh novelist (died 1935)
- May 17 – Jacint Verdaguer, Catalan poet (died 1902)
- June 3 – Estelle Mendell Amory, American educator and author (unknown year of death)
- June 13 – Alphonse-Jules Wauters, Belgian writer and editor (died 1916)
- June 15 – Jennie McCowen, American physician, writer and medical journal editor (died 1924)
- June 17 – Emily Lawless, Irish modernist novelist and poet (died 1913)
- July 18 – Tristan Corbière, French poet (died 1875)
- July 26 – Martina Swafford, American poet (died 1913)
- August 10 – Abai Qunanbaiuly, Kazakh poet, philosopher and cultural reformer (died 1904)
- August 11 – Addie C. Strong Engle, American author and publisher (died 1926)
- August 27 – Martha Capps Oliver, American poet and hymnwriter (died 1917)
- September 3 – Louise Herschman Mannheimer, Czech-American author, school founder, and inventor (died 1920)
- September 20 – Sarah Dyer Hobart, American author (died 1921)
- September 30 – Margaret Dye Ellis, American social reformer, lobbyist and correspondent (died 1925)
- October 14 – Olindo Guerrini, Italian poet (died 1916)
- October 25 – Rebecca Agatha Armour, Canadian novelist (died 1891)
- November 19 – Agnes Giberne, English children's writer (died 1939)
- November 25 – José Maria de Eça de Queirós, Portuguese novelist (died 1900)
- December 6 – Rose Porter, American religious novelist (died 1906)

== Deaths ==
- January 22 – Pierre Hyacinthe Azaïs, French philosopher (born 1766)
- February 22 – Rev. Sydney Smith, English writer and wit (born 1771)
- May 3 – Thomas Hood, English poet and humorist (born 1799)
- May 12
  - János Batsányi, Hungarian poet and anti-Habsburg activist (born 1763)
  - August Wilhelm Schlegel, German poet and translator (born 1767)
- May 26 – Jónas Hallgrímsson, Icelandic poet (accident, born 1807)
- June 17 – Rev. Richard Harris Barham (Thomas Ingoldsby) English comic poet (ulcerated larynx, born 1788)
- July 12 – Henrik Wergeland, Norwegian poet and dramatist (tuberculosis; born 1808)
- August 3 – Charlotte Ann Fillebrown Jerauld, American poet and story writer (born 1820)
- October 26 – Carolina Oliphant, Lady Nairne, Scottish songwriter and collector (born 1766)
- November 11 – Maria Gowen Brooks, American poet (tropical fever, born c. 1794)

== Sources ==
- Meyers, Jeffrey. Edgar Allan Poe: His Life and Legacy. New York City: Cooper Square Press, 1992. ISBN 0-8154-1038-7
- Sova, Dawn B. Edgar Allan Poe: A to Z. New York City: Checkmark Books, 2001. ISBN 0-8160-4161-X
- Thomas, Dwight and David K. Jackson. The Poe Log: A Documentary Life of Edgar Allan Poe, 1809–1849. New York: G. K. Hall & Company, 1987. ISBN 0-7838-1401-1
