= The Half-Breed (short story) =

Story written by Walt Whitman

- Author: Walt Whitman
- Original title: Arrow-Tip
- Published in: Brooklyn Daily Eagle
- English publication date: June 1–6, 8-9 1846
- Media type: Newspaper

The Half-Breed; A Tale of the Western Frontier is a fictional story written by Walt Whitman, which was originally published anonymously in the Aristidean in March 1845 under the name of "Arrow-Tip". It was published as The Half-Breed; A Tale of the Western Frontier, in June 1846 in The Brooklyn Daily Eagle. It was reprinted in 1927 by Columbia University Press in The Half-Breed and other stories by Walt Whitman. The other stories in the 1927 volume were "Shirval, a Tale of Jerusalem"; "Richard Parker's Widow"; "Some Fact-Romances"; and "My Boys and Girls." The story takes place west of the Mississippi River in a little town called Warren.

In his "Introduction" to the 1927 volume, Thomas Ollive Mabbott writes that The Half-Breed "is very valuable as showing how much Whitman had learned about writing a long narrative since he had composed the chaotic Franklin Evans. It gives too, another proof of his fondness for Indian subjects, and ... his theory that the Indians and pioneers were very appropriately to be treated in the 'true and legitimate romance of America'"

The Half-Breed is a tale of the relationship between local Native Americans and the white settlers who inhabit Warren and the idea of Westward expansion. Walt Whitman was a strong supporter of Westward expansion. The main characters get along until a thief is caught and a white man, Peter Brown, is thought to be dead. This reveals some possible hidden agendas of a few of the characters, along with some underlying suspicions from the townsfolk. There is a character of "mixed-blood", Boddo, who is described as a half white and half Native American hunchback of the town. He does not seem to be respected by the people of the town, due to his appearance. Once revealed, Boddo's story helps the audience understand why the short story was given his name. This tale shows the attitude around this time period, while adding mystery and stories of betrayals.

== Background ==
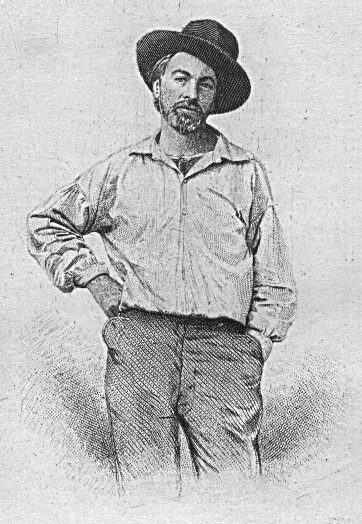
Walt Whitman a few years after writing The Half-Breed; A Tale of the Western Frontier

Walt Whitman wrote The Half-Breed; A Tale of the Western Frontier during the lead up to the Mexican-American War, while he was editor of the Brooklyn Daily Eagle. He frequently voiced his opinions of Mexico, especially regarding the wars between the United States and Mexican territories. When talking about how Mexico will be affected by the war, Whitman says "Mexico will be a severed and cut up nation. She deserves this,—or rather her government deserves it, because Mexican rule has been more a libel on liberty than liberty itself". He believed in manifest destiny, and wanted the United States to expand as far as it could. Therefore, he supported the wars fought against anyone who would get in the way of that. As Shivley states, "Whitman supported the Wilmot Proviso that would exclude slavery from conquered territories and called for an end to the war. Those like Whitman who could not support the extension of slavery founded the Free Soil Party".

The Half-Breed is one of Whitman's early novels, which include Franklin Evans, or the Inebriate (1842), a temperance novel, and Life and Adventures of Jack Engle (1852), which was rediscovered in 2015. Throughout his works, Whitman alludes to Native Americans and contributes to the "vanishing Indian" trope. Critics disagree about Whitman's racial bias towards Native Americans. Some argue that he shows "fondness for Indian subjects" because of his frequent inclusion of Natives in his narratives. Others argue that the representation of Native people contributed to a negative mindset toward them. For example, some say that in The Half-Breed Whitman "lapses into the stock racial profile of an 'apathetic' and expressionless Native American." The silent Native character, mixed in with Whitman's inclusion of expansion, feeds into the vanishing Indian trope.

In The Half Breed, Whitman seems to include another political statement. Many say he is creating an argument against capital punishment. In the story Arrow-Tip "dies as a result of mistaken testimony, revenge, and a precipitant legal hanging." Arrow-Tip's unnecessary death highlights the dangers of capital punishment's being imposed on the wrongfully accused, and shows that the aftermath of that situation is messy and difficult to deal with.

== Plot ==
The story opens with Boddo, who is an ill-respected, physically deformed, and unattractive man of white and Native American parentage, as he travels to ask Father Luke to perform a wedding ceremony for the blacksmith Peter Brown and his intended. Some items are stolen from Mr. Thorne, and Arrow-Tip is assumed to be the thief despite there being no evidence to suggest this. Shortly after, Arrow-Tip uncovers the thief as the hunchback, Boddo.

Meanwhile, Peter's bride befriends Father Luke and convinces him to tell her of the events that brought him to his current situation. He tells her of his upbringing in Ireland and of his coming to America. Upon arriving to America, he meets a Native American woman with whom he fathers a child, Boddo, who is unaware of his paternity. His story is interrupted by disturbing news of an event that took place during a hunting party. Two of the men in the party floating on a raft had heard Peter Brown and Arrow-Tip quarreling. Upon reaching shore, they discover the blacksmith unconscious next to a silent Arrow-Tip. He refuses to answer any questions. Incorrectly thinking Peter to be dead, the two men throw a blanket over him and take Arrow-Tip back to the village to announce Peter's death and Arrow-Tip's crime.

Upon waking up, Peter remembers the argument he had with Arrow-Tip and deems himself to have been in the wrong. He's discovered by Boddo, who takes him to Father Luke's cave, the safest available shelter. While fetching water for Peter, Boddo meets Father Luke, who tells him that Arrow-Tip has been accused of Peter's murder. When Peter learns of Arrow-Tip's situation, he suggests sending Boddo to alert the villagers that he is alive, because he is still too weak to make the journey himself. While traveling to the village, Boddo decides not to carry out his errand, as revenge against Arrow-Tip for exposing his thievery earlier in the story. He and the villagers travel to the place of the purported murder and discover that Peter is gone, causing them to assume that Deer, Arrow-Tip's brother, stole the body away in an attempt to acquit Arrow-Tip.

When they return home the townspeople are certain of Arrow-Tip's guilt and decide upon vengeance. Arrow-Tip manages to convince the men to let him tell his story in front of the entire village and does so, saying that the quarrel was over a wager over who would – or wouldn't – catch any game, with some of their possessions as the prize. During the conversation Peter lost his temper and upon seeing Arrow-Tip try to take the weapon he had wagered, the two men began to scuffle and Peter is injured. Arrow-Tip believes that he killed Peter, as do the townspeople. Boddo is the only person who can enlighten them, but he doesn't come forward. As a result, Arrow-Tip is sentenced to be hanged the following morning. That morning the townspeople assemble to witness the hanging. Deer is allowed to visit his brother. During their meeting Arrow-Tip tells him that he is determined to approach his impending death stoically and that his sentence would have been the same with their own people.

While this is taking place, two schoolchildren discover Peter Brown sunning himself along the riverbank near Father Luke's home. They quickly rush to Master Caleb who, along with Quincy, travel to Father Luke's cave and tell him and Peter of the impending execution. They quickly travel to tell the others that Peter is alive, but they and Peter are too late and arrive just after Arrow-Tip's hanging. Attempts to cut him down and revive him are unsuccessful. Three days after Arrow-Tip's death Father Luke and Deer leave the town. Whitman states that years into the future an aged friar will be buried, while hundreds of miles away an Indian leader leads his tribe further west in an attempt to avoid being bothered by the white man. The fate of Boddo is unknown, only that he fled the town and is believed to be either dead or living a similar miserable existence in another place. Meanwhile, Master Caleb has become the leader of an incorporated academy, while Quincy is well respected and will likely be nominated for political office. One of his admirers is Peter Brown, who has survived and fathered multiple children.

== Characters ==
- Boddo: The "half-breed" of the story who was mistreated not only because of the color of his skin but because of his lack of intelligence and hunched back. He is later shown to be a liar and a thief and became the villain of the story.
- Peter Brown: A blacksmith, he marries the daughter of a respectable man. Peter is thought to have been killed by Arrow-Tip, but he actually recovered in the care of Father Luke.
- Arrow-Tip: Arrow-Tip is the brother of Deer. He is suspected of theft followed by being accused of murder, for which he is executed. It is later discovered out that Arrow-Tip did not murder Peter Brown. Because Boddo did not come forth with this information, Arrow-Tip was executed for the murder of Peter Brown.
- Deer: Deer is the brother of Arrow-Tip and says little throughout the story.
- Master Caleb: Master Caleb is an educator in Warren and a friend of a child in his class named Quincy.
- Father Luke: Father Luke is a monk who lives a short distance from the town of Warren. He is revealed to be Boddo's biological father.

== Themes ==
Isolation/Abandonment: Many times in the text characters text deal with abandonment and not feeling accepted. For example, Boddo was picked on simply because he did not look like everyone else or have the same intellect as them. He was also shunned by his father. Whitman makes it clear throughout the text that Native characters were only in Warren for a short time, or if they stayed they were outcasts, as when Arrow-Tip remained silent after he was accused of murder. The idea of isolation or abandoning someone or something relates to the Vanishing Indian trope, which shows the erasure of Native American people through history and literature, but is still relevant and can be found to this day.

Absence of Women: "The absence of women in the tale also strikes one as odd, even for a frontier story." Throughout the story there are brief mentions of three women (Peter Brown's wife, Boddo's mother, and Father Luke's sister) that do not serve a strong purpose, but simply note their name and relation to a prominent husband or another male character of the text. Peter Brown's fiancée "serves as a mere audience for Father Luke's long monologue regarding his scandalous past" Though the absence of women is "hidden" in that Whitman does not explicitly note it, it still strikes as a theme worth emphasizing in relation to the meaning of the text. Women in the short story were only used as vessels for men to get what they need, which shows how women were viewed at the time.

Representation of Mixed Race People: Boddo is mentioned as "deformed in body – his back being mounted with a mighty hunch, and his long neck bent forward, in a peculiar and disagreeable manner". All other characters mentioned in the text, including Native American people, would be considered normal and without any deformities. In fact, "Whitman's idealization of Arrow-Tip, the story's pure-blood, is portrayed above all as honest, noble, and endowed with a close-to-the-land authenticity. The racism against Native Americans is projected almost exclusively upon Boddo, just as he also embodies the "monstrous" nature of any mixing of the races." By making Boddo, our "half-breed" character, the center of the story, Whitman highlights his deformities. The only space a mixed-race person has in this text is as a deformed, hated character. The idea of mixed-race people during this time was anathema, and Boddo is an example of what could happen to one of them. "And so is Boddo vilified as the stock villain of his story, in part because of the others' anxious inability to 'class' him as 'Red' or 'White', as an entity indefinitely positioned on the 'Chain’. And yet there are places in the tale in which an inkling of sympathy for Boddo peeks through the cracks"
