= Peter Doyle (transit worker) =

American transit worker close to Walt Whitman (1843–1907)

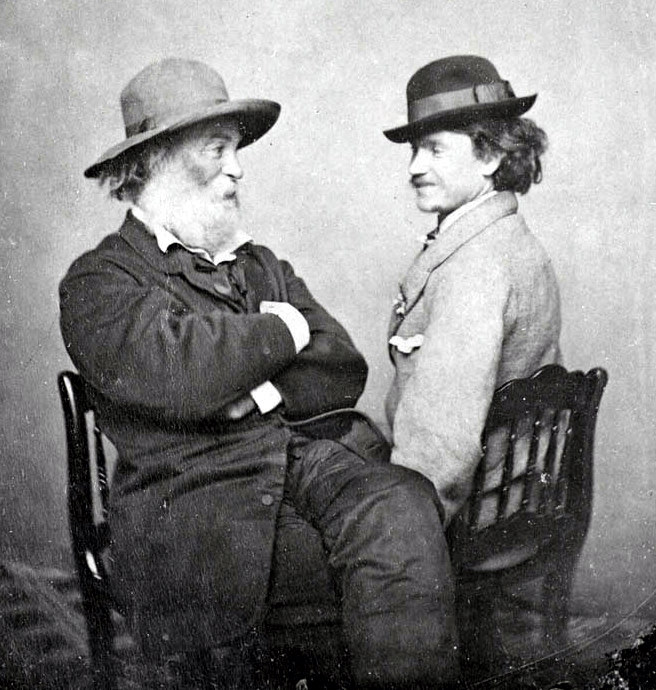
- Doyle (right) with Walt Whitman
- Born: Peter George Doyle; June 1843; Ireland
- Died: April 19, 1907 (aged 63); Philadelphia, Pennsylvania, US
- Occupation: Transit worker

Peter George Doyle (June 1843 – April 19, 1907) was an Irish-born American transit worker, known for being an intimate companion of Walt Whitman from around 1865 to 1876, and to some extent to Whitman's death in 1892. Doyle also witnessed the assassination of Abraham Lincoln in 1865.

== Biography ==
Peter George Doyle was born in early June 1843 in Ireland to Peter George Doyle, a blacksmith, and Catherine Nash Doyle, the sixth of nine children. He was baptized on June 16, 1843, in Limerick. (Note: Doyle would later give his birth year as 1847 and Whitman himself thought June 3, 1845.) He moved with members of his family to Alexandria, Virginia, in 1853, travelling through Baltimore which they reached on May 10. Doyle was not well educated. He grew to be around 5 feet 8 inches (1.73 m) tall. Doyle's niece described him as "a homosexual".

Somewhere between 1856 and 1859, the Doyles moved to Richmond, Virginia, where Peter Sr. found employment at the Tredegar Iron Works. When the American Civil War broke out, Doyle enlisted in the Confederate States Army on April 25, 1861. He fought in several engagements of the war, including the Battle of Antietam, where he was wounded and he was discharged on November 7, 1862. He likely re-joined the army for a time in 1863 before deserting and fleeing North, where he was placed in a prison near Old Capitol Prison in April 1863. He was released on May 11 and began working at the Washington Navy Yard in Washington, D.C., holding a position there until 1865. After the war ended, he lived in Washington, D.C., and worked as a streetcar conductor for the Washington and Georgetown Railroad Company.

Doyle was an eyewitness to the assassination of Abraham Lincoln at Ford's Theatre on April 14, 1865. Whitman later drew on Doyle's account of his experience.

=== Relationship with Whitman ===
Doyle first met Whitman in 1865 on a "cold, stormy night". Whitman was the only passenger on Doyle's streetcar at the time, and the two began talking. They became very close friends, corresponding regularly and frequently meeting. Whitman often rode Doyle's streetcar, they went on numerous hikes together, and wrote many letters, Whitman addressing Doyle as "boy" or "son", while Doyle signed his "Pete the Great". The historian Martin G Murray wrote that Doyle may have influenced Whitman's famous poem "O Captain! My Captain!", arguing that Whitman adopted a more conventional form to appeal to Doyle. The hero in Whitman's "Come Up From the Fields Father" is named "Pete" and according to Murray, Doyle may have inspired some of the poems or influenced Whitman's writing in the book Drum-Taps.

In May 1870, the two briefly traveled to New York City, where they saw the opera Poliuto. Whitman was known to abbreviate Doyle as "16.4" (P being the 16th letter of the alphabet and D the fourth) in his diary. Whitman may have begun to worry that he loved Doyle and Doyle did not reciprocate. Whitman wanted to live with Doyle, but Doyle initially refused as he was supporting his mother. By the end of 1870, Whitman was more confident in their relationship. In 1872 or 1873, Doyle began working on the Pennsylvania Railroad as a braker. After Whitman had a stroke in 1873, Doyle helped to nurse him. Doyle gradually grew unhappy with his job and continued to visit Whitman, even after he moved to Camden, New Jersey, in 1874. After 1876, the two wrote and visited each other much less.

Doyle met Richard Maurice Bucke, a promoter and early biographer of Whitman, in 1880. After 1885, he moved permanently to Philadelphia, where he was a member of the Benevolent and Protective Order of Elks and joined the United Confederate Veterans. The last time Doyle and Whitman were in contact may have been 1889, though they likely met at least once after that. Whitman left Doyle his watch and Doyle visited Whitman's body after he died in 1892, though he was almost not allowed into the funeral. Doyle was friends with Horace Traubel and his wife Anne Traubel, as well as Gustave Percival Wiksell, Horace's friend or lover.

Whitman's letters to Doyle were published in 1895 as Calamus, A Series of Letters Written During the Years 1868-1880 by Walt Whitman To A Young Friend (Peter Doyle). The collection has generally been recognized as being of love letters, and received mixed reviews. After Whitman died, Doyle had a coat that Whitman had worn, saying it was like "Aladdin's lamp". For the rest of his life, Doyle was considered a celebrity by "friends and followers" of Whitman.

== Death and interment ==
Doyle died on April 19, 1907, in Philadelphia of uremia. He is buried in the Congressional Cemetery in Washington, D.C.

== Legacy ==
A portrait of Doyle and Whitman was taken around 1865 by M. P. Rice. It is the earliest known portrait of Whitman with someone else. Paraphrasing Thomas Gray's "Elegy Written in a Country Churchyard", John Burroughs described Doyle as "a mute inglorious Whitman".

Doyle is considered possibly the most likely candidate for the love of Whitman's life. Whitman's biographer Justin Kaplan wrote in 1980 that "Whitman extended himself with Peter Doyle farther than he had with any other man and at greater risk to his psychic safety." Their relationship has been described as a "romantic friendship", though its exact nature is unknown.

== Bibliography ==
- Kaplan, Justin (1979). Walt Whitman: A Life. New York: Simon and Schuster. ISBN 0-671-22542-1.
- Loving, Jerome (1999). Walt Whitman: The Song of Himself. University of California Press. ISBN 0-520-22687-9.
- Murray, Martin (July 1, 1994). ""Pete the Great": A Biography of Peter Doyle". Walt Whitman Quarterly Review. 12 (1): 1–51. doi:10.13008/2153-3695.1429. ISSN 0737-0679.
- Reynolds, David S. (1995). Walt Whitman's America: A Cultural Biography. New York: Vintage Books. ISBN 0-679-76709-6.
