= Rebecca Agatha Armour =

Canadian teacher and novelist (1845–1891)

Rebecca Agatha Armour (25 October 1845 – 24 April 1891) was a Canadian teacher and novelist born in Fredericton, New Brunswick. Her fiction has been said to provide a "rich depiction of New Brunswick social life during the 19th century." The intention behind it was to cherish "every right and institution which makes our beloved New Brunswick the pride of its loyal people."

== Life ==
Armour was the eldest of the four daughters of a grocer, Joseph Armour, and his wife Margaret Hazlett. Both her parents had immigrated from Ireland, her father from Coleraine in Ulster. She had a Presbyterian upbringing. She graduated from the local Provincial Teachers' College, a normal school, and gained her teaching licence on 30 November 1863.

Armour taught in Fredericton for many years, but moved to a school in Lancaster (now part of Saint John), probably in May 1873, when her teaching licence was transferred there. She seems to have moved back in 1878 to Fredericton, where she married on 22 January 1885 a carriage maker, John G. Thompson, who was also the child of Irish Presbyterians. They had no children.

According to an unattributed comment in the Dictionary of Canadian Biography, Armour earned praise as "one of the best lady teachers in the service in New Brunswick."

Armour died on 24 April 1891, within three weeks of the death of her mother, whose will, signed only days before in favour of Armour and her husband, was contested by one of her sisters.

== Literary works ==
Armour's first novel, Lady Rosamond's Secret. A Romance of Fredericton (1878), was published by the Saint John Telegraph. It deals with life in Fredericton during the New Brunswick lieutenant-generalship of Sir Howard Douglas, Bt. in 1824–1831. It has been criticized for "stilted dialogue, self-conscious authorial intrusions, and sycophantic praise of Sir Howard," but it provides a factual account of local society in that period.

Also of local historical interest are the sketches entitled "Landmarks of Old Fredericton", at least five of which appeared anonymously in the journal Capital in 1880 (eight between September and November that year, but not all the numbers of the journal have survived). Armour's penultimate novel, Marguerite Verne, or Scenes from Canadian Life (1886), is set in Saint John at the time of writing. This has been criticized for "abrupt transitions, authorial asides, heavy-handed moralism, and convenient coincidences." There are no known surviving copies of two further novels published in her lifetime: Sylvia Leigh; or, the Heiress of Glenmarle (1880) and Marion Wilburn (date of publication not known).

The author described her motives for writing novels in Marguerite Verne: "We have liberty, right, education, refinement and culture in our midst; we have a good government, noble reforms, and all advantages to make us good and happy. Then let us cherish every right and institution which makes our beloved New Brunswick the pride of its loyal people. It is such feeling which prompts this work, and if the different scenes throughout the province which we will endeavour to portray, the usages of society, custom, &c., and the few characters introduced from real life, meet your approbation, our highest expectation will be realized."

According to Lorna Sage, an English historian of women's writing, "[Armour's] fiction remains of interest for its rich depiction of New Brunswick social life during the 19th century."
