= Jerome Loving =

American literary critic and academic

- Education: Pennsylvania State University; Duquesne University; Duke University
- Occupation: Academic
- Employer: Texas A&M University at College Station

Jerome Loving is an American literary critic and academic. He is Distinguished Professor Emeritus of American Literature and Culture at Texas A&M University at College Station, and the author of several books about Walt Whitman, Theodore Dreiser, Mark Twain and Emily Dickinson. His Jack and Norman: A State-raised Convict and the Legacy of Norman Mailer's The Executioner's Song is under option by Annapurna Films. His Vietnam memoir After the Good War will be published by the Texas A&M University Press in the fall of 2026. He served as a Fulbright Professor in Leningrad in 1978 and Paris in 1989–90. He also taught at the Sorbonne in 1984 and at the University of Texas at Austin in 1986. His biography of Walt Whitman was a finalist for the Los Angeles Book Prize in 2000. He was awarded a Guggenheim Fellowship for his scholarly contributions to American Literature in 2002.
