= Minnie Willis Baines =

American author

Minnie Willis Baines Miller
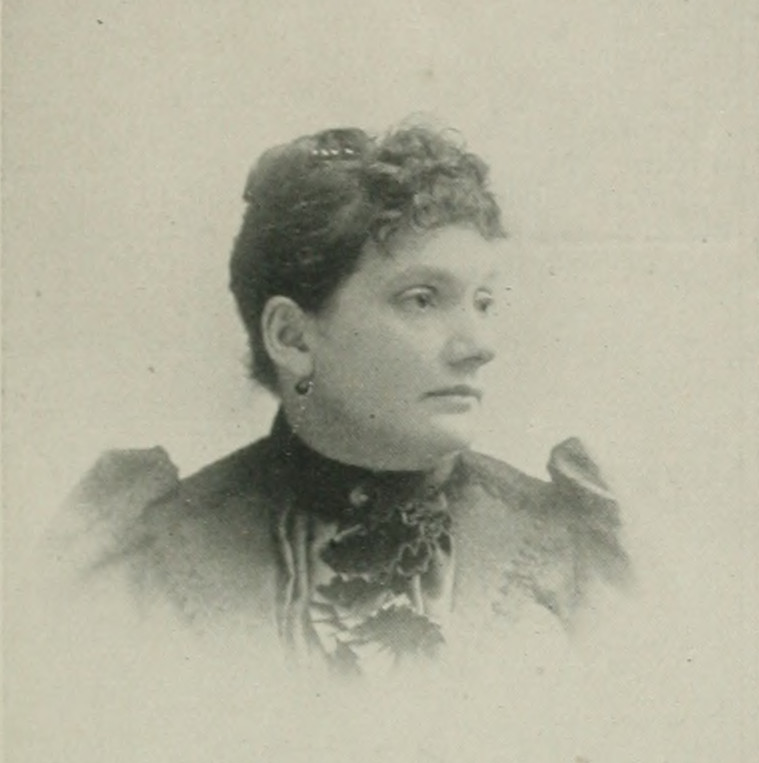
- Photo in A Woman of the Century
- Born: Minnie Willis; January 8, 1845; Lebanon, New Hampshire, U.S.
- Died: February 15, 1923 (aged 78); Springfield, Ohio, U.S.
- Education: Wittenberg College
- Occupation: Author
- Spouse(s): Evan Franklin Baines (m. 1863), Leroy Edgar Miller (m. 1892)
- Children: Florence May Baines, Frank Willis Baines
- Writing career
- Pen name: We
- Language: English
- Subject: religion

Signature
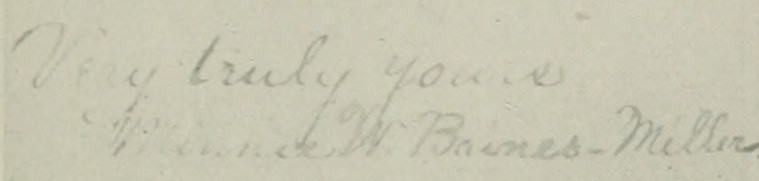

Minnie Willis Baines (née Willis, after first marriage, Baines, after a second marriage, Baines-Miller; January 8, 1845 – February 15, 1923) was an American author. She favored temperance, morality, religion, and women's suffrage, writing innumerable short stories and poems in magazines and papers from the age of fourteen. Her most notable works were The Silent Land; His Cousin, The Doctor; The Pilgrim's Vision; and Mrs. Cherry's Sister. Baines-Miller died in 1923.

== Early life and education ==
Minnie Willis was born in Lebanon, New Hampshire, on January 8, 1845. Her parents were Horace F. and Minerva J. (Tisdale) Willis. The first years of her life were spent in New England.

Her taste for composition in both poetry and prose was a feature of her character in childhood. She was educated at the commons schools of Springfield, Ohio, before receiving a degree of A.M. from Wittenberg College.

== Career ==
She began her literary career at the age of fourteen, when her first sketch was published in Waverly Magazine. Her writing, during many years of her life, was without any fixed purpose, save that of indulging her own inclination and entertaining others. Her best-known works were The Silent Land (Cincinnati, 1890), His Cousin, The Doctor (Cincinnati, 1891), and The Pilgrim's Vision (Cincinnati, 1892). Baines-Miller was also a regular contributor to various religious newspapers, writing over her own name, and more often behind an editorial "we" or a pen name.

Baines-Miller was the first president of the Springfield Woman's Pioneer Press Club, a literary association formed of women who wrote for the press. During the Women's Crusade throughout Ohio and the western States, and also in the popular temperance movement known as the "Murphy Work", she was an active participant, lecturing extensively and successfully in her own and other U.S. states. She favored woman suffrage, having written and talked in its favor for many years, and was a very strong believer in equal rights.

== Style and themes ==
In the Methodist Book Concern of 1898, a review of Baines-Miller's His Cousin, The Doctor noted it was a story that dealt principally with the faith-cure delusion. It was described as a good story, with interesting characters, an engaging plot, as well as novelty of incident, and brightness of conversation. The reviewer mentioned that in the days of the “purpose-novel”, it would be strange if someone did not use the opportunity "to put the faith-curists into a story", and in fact, several authors made the attempt with various degrees of success. If Baines-Miller's is the best of the stories from that reviewer's point of view, it was perhaps because her story better concealed her purpose. The book was described not only as good reading but as an admirable antidote to certain much-talked-of theories of healing.

Mrs. Cherry's Sister (Cincinnati: Jennings & Pye, 1900) was reviewed by The Forum in 1901 who stated that this book was not a sermon nor a treatise, but rather a story. Baines-Miller, whose writings were well known to the reading public and whose books appealed to the heart through the common sense shown in her pictures of real life and character, sought in this book to reach the judgment through natural and attractive studies of characters taken from real life. The author did not claim to cover the field of the psychologist, and did not make any display of her knowledge of his methods, but made free use of the results of his work in her delineations of characters and situations throughout the story. This book was said to do much towards a better understanding of the fascination which Christian Science had for so many people of that era. In A Study of Religious Literature for the Young (1905), A. L. Baker remarked that Mrs. Cherry's Sister was an answer to Christian Science in the form of a religious love story, that it was of excellent value for those who were troubled over this form of religion, and that the accepted doctrines of the Church were given using appropriate language.

== Personal life ==
She mostly lived in Springfield, Ohio, where her literary work was accomplished. She married Evan Franklin Baines in 1863; and secondly married Leroy Edgar Miller on February 18, 1892, in Springfield. Baines-Miller was a member of the Methodist Episcopal Church. She lost both of her children, Florence May Baines and Frank Willis Baines, within three years of each other. Afterward, she devoted herself to religious literature.

Minnie Baines Miller died February 15, 1923, at her home in Springfield, Ohio. Burial was made in that city's Ferncliff cemetery.

== Selected works ==
=== By Minnie Willis Baines ===
- The Silent Land: A Study, 1890
- The Pilgrim's Vision: An Allegory, 1891
- His Cousin the Doctor: A Story, 1891

=== By Minnie W. Baines-Miller ===
- Mrs. Cherry's Sister, or, Christian science at Fairfax, 1900
