= Satanstoe =

Novel by James Fenimore Cooper

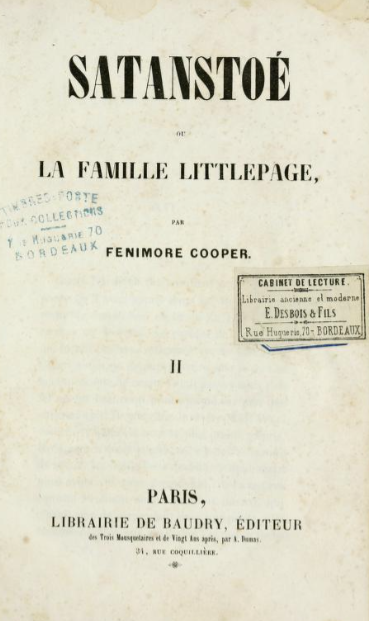
- Title page for Satanstoe (1845)
- Author: James Fenimore Cooper
- Original title: Satanstoe; or, The Littlepage Manuscripts, a Tale of the Colony
- Language: English
- Genre: Roman à clef
- Published: 1845
- Followed by: The Chainbearer; or, The Littlepage Manuscripts

Satanstoe is an 1845 novel by the early American novelist James Fenimore Cooper. The novel, sometimes listed with the alternate title The Family of Littlepage or The Littlepage Manuscripts, is the first of a three novel cycle, followed by The Chainbearer and The Redskins. The novel is a fictional autobiography which explores the 18th century colony of New York.
