= Life and Adventures of Jack Engle =

1852 novel by Walt Whitman

- Cover of the 2017 book printing
- Author: Walt Whitman
- Genre: City mystery
- Publisher: New York Sunday Dispatch (newspaper serial); University of Iowa Press (book)
- Publication date: 1852 (newspaper serial); 2017 (book)

Life and Adventures of Jack Engle: An Auto-Biography: A Story of New York at the Present Time in Which the Reader Will Find Some Familiar Characters is a city mystery novel by Walt Whitman. It was first published anonymously in 1852 as a serial in a newspaper before being rediscovered in 2017, when it was reprinted in journal article and book form.

== Background ==
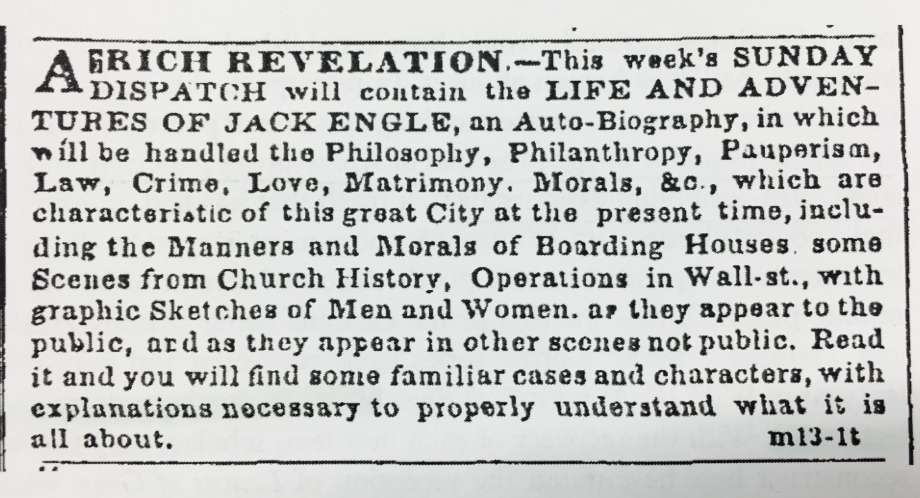
Advertisement promoting Life and Adventures of Jack Engle by Walt Whitman in The New York Times, March 13, 1852

Life and Adventures of Jack Engle was first published anonymously in serial form in the New York Sunday Dispatch newspaper from March 14 to April 18, 1852. It was advertised in The New York Times as a "Rich Revelation" and an "Auto-Biography."

It was unknown and not republished until in 2017 in the academic journal Walt Whitman Quarterly Review after it was rediscovered by University of Houston graduate student Zachary Turpin as a work by Whitman.

== Reprinting and reception ==
After its rediscovery, Jennifer Schuessler in The New York Times called the work a "quasi-Dickensian tale" with "more than a few unlikely plot twists and jarring narrative shifts". Turpin called it "a fun, rollicking, creative, twisty, bizarre little book". In 2017 the story was published in book form, edited and introduced by Turpin, by the University of Iowa Press in its Iowa Whitman Series. There is yet little literary scholarship on the novel; the first two critical essays to deal with the novel—authored by Stefan Schöberlein and Stephanie M. Blalock, and Scott T. Zukowski—appeared in the Walt Whitman Quarterly Review in 2020.

== See also ==
- Manly Health and Training
