= Lepha Eliza Bailey =

American author and social reformer (1845–1924)

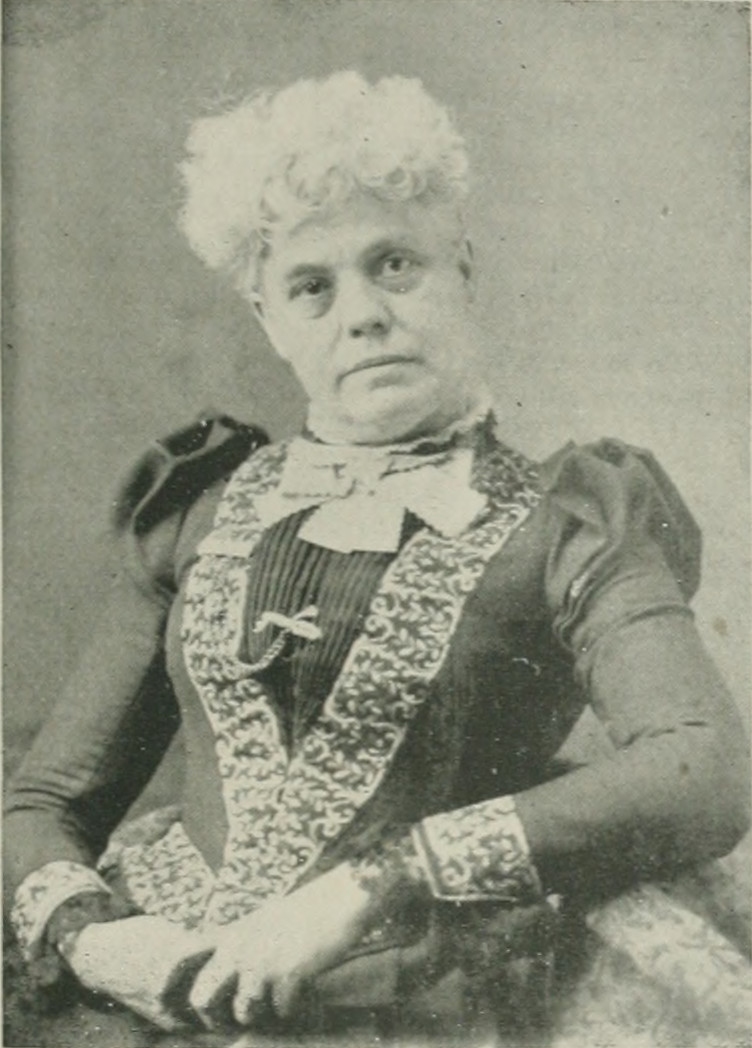
- Photo in A Woman of the Century
- Born: Lepha Eliza Dunton; January 21, 1845; Battle Creek, Michigan, U.S.
- Died: May 1, 1924 (aged 79); Lake Worth, Florida, U.S.
- Resting place: Pinecrest Cemetery, Lake Worth
- Education: Battle Creek College (now Andrews University)
- Occupations: author, lecturer
- Spouse: Lewis Bailey (m. 1873)
- Writing career
- Language: English
- Genres: prose, verse
- Literary movement: temperance, suffrage

Lepha Eliza Bailey (née, Dunton; January 21, 1845 − May 1, 1924) was an American author, lecturer, and social reformer. She was a lecturer of national repute upon temperance and woman's suffrage. In 1880, she was invited to speak under the auspices of the National Prohibition Alliance. She responded and continued to work in the eastern part of the United States until that society disbanded, and finally merged with the Prohibition Party, under whose auspices she worked for years over the temperance movement. She delivered hundreds of lectures on reform subjects, and was one of the most talented leaders in the field of prohibition. She contributed extensively to the periodical press, edited various departments in newspapers, and was the author of several works in prose and verse.

== Early life and education ==
Lepha Eliza Dunton was born in Battle Creek, Michigan, January 21, 1845. Her father was of Scotch descent. Both parents were born and reared in Georgia, Vermont, and their family consisted of nine children, all born in Georgia and Vermont, except Bailey, the youngest. Her girlhood was passed in Wisconsin when that part of the country was a wilderness. From there, the family moved to Battle Creek in the fall of 1840. Michigan was at that time an unbroken wilderness.

She received her education in the public schools of her native city, and at Battle Creek College (which became Andrews University).

== Career ==
Bailey became a teacher in a rural school when only fourteen years old. In early life, Bailey also contributed to local papers. She was a member of many local organizations, including the Woman's Christian Temperance Union (WCTU), Sovereigns of Industry, Independent Order of Good Templars, and Grangers, and was an officer of each. When the red-ribbon movement became prominent, Bailey took an active interest in its development, and she dated her work as a speaker from her local labor for the WCTU and red-ribbon clubs.

Bailey edited a department in Our Age, published at Battle Creek, continuing for three years. In 1876–77, she wrote much for the Grange Visitor, and gave talks upon the labor question before assemblies of Grangers, at that time flourishing in Michigan. In 1878, she was invited by the State amendment committee, to canvas her own county on the question of a prohibitory amendment submitted to the people. She gave 200 lectures, speaking in cities, villages, and school districts. For two years previous, Bailey had been speaking occasionally upon the temperance question and woman suffrage, but her active public work began with the amendment campaign in her own State, after which time, she was constantly in field service, having been actively engaged in every State where an amendment campaign had been inaugurated. In 1880, Bailey was invited to speak under the auspices of the National Prohibition Alliance. She responded, and worked in the field until that society disbanded, and finally merged with the Prohibition Party.

== Personal life ==
On October 21, 1873, she married Lewis Bailey, of Battle Creek. Two of their four children died in infancy.

Lepha Bailey died May 1, 1924, in Lake Worth, Florida, and is buried at Pinecrest Cemetery in Lake Worth.
