= Franklin Evans =

1842 novel by Walt Whitman

Franklin Evans, or The Inebriate: A Tale of the Times
- Title page, reprint edition
- Author: Walt Whitman
- Genre: Temperance
- Publication date: 1842

Franklin Evans; or The Inebriate is a temperance novel by Walt Whitman first published in 1842.

== Plot overview ==
Franklin Evans; or The Inebriate: A Tale of the Times, the first novel written by Walt Whitman, is the rags-to-riches story of Franklin Evans. Franklin Evans starts as an innocent young man, leaving Long Island to come to New York City for the opportunity to better himself. Being young and naïve, he is easily influenced by someone whom he befriended (Colby) and eventually becomes a drunkard. He tries many times to abstain from alcohol but does not succeed until after the death of his two wives. The novel portrays the journey of a young man living and learning through his mistakes, picking up life lessons along the way.

== Characters ==
- Franklin Evans: The main character of the novel.
- Colby: The first person whom Evans befriends. He introduces Evans to music halls, theaters and taverns when he first gets to the city. At the end of the novel, Evans sees Colby being made a fool of by some children for money. This image helps Evans reflect on what he could have become had he not quit drinking.
- Mr. Lee: A gentleman who takes a liking toward Evans. He helps him to get a job when first getting to the city and watches his life unfold from a distance. On his death bed, Lee calls for Evans to come see him and tells him that he has left his fortune to him. Like his late wife, Evans is a drunkard but Evans does not let it take him to his grave. Mr. Lee feels that when Evans came to the city, he should have watched over him as a father, would and since he failed to do so, he wants to make up for his neglect.
- Mary Evans: Franklin's first wife. Evans and Mary are in love, but she dies because of his neglect toward her.
- The Marchion Family: After saving their daughter from drowning, the Marchion family helps Evans when he is thrown in jail and helps him both times he tries to abstain from alcohol.
- Bourne: The friend whom Evans stays with when he leaves the city and reintroduces him to drink.
- Margaret: She is a slave but is given her freedom when Evans decides he wanted to marry her. Their marriage is not pleasant because Evans does not really love her; he only thought he did in his drunken state. Evans' love for another woman leads her to commit murder and then suicide.
- Mrs. Conway: After marrying Margaret, Evans meets Mrs. Conway and takes an instant liking to her. He spends more time with her than with his wife and would do anything for her. Knowing that Evans never would say no to her, she asks for the brother of Margaret to be her servant. Evans complies with her and causes so much anger in Margaret that she plots to kill Mrs. Conway in her quest for revenge. When her plan backfires and her brother becomes ill and dies, Margaret decides to strangle her. Not being able to live with the guilt, she kills herself.
