= Martina Swafford =

American poet

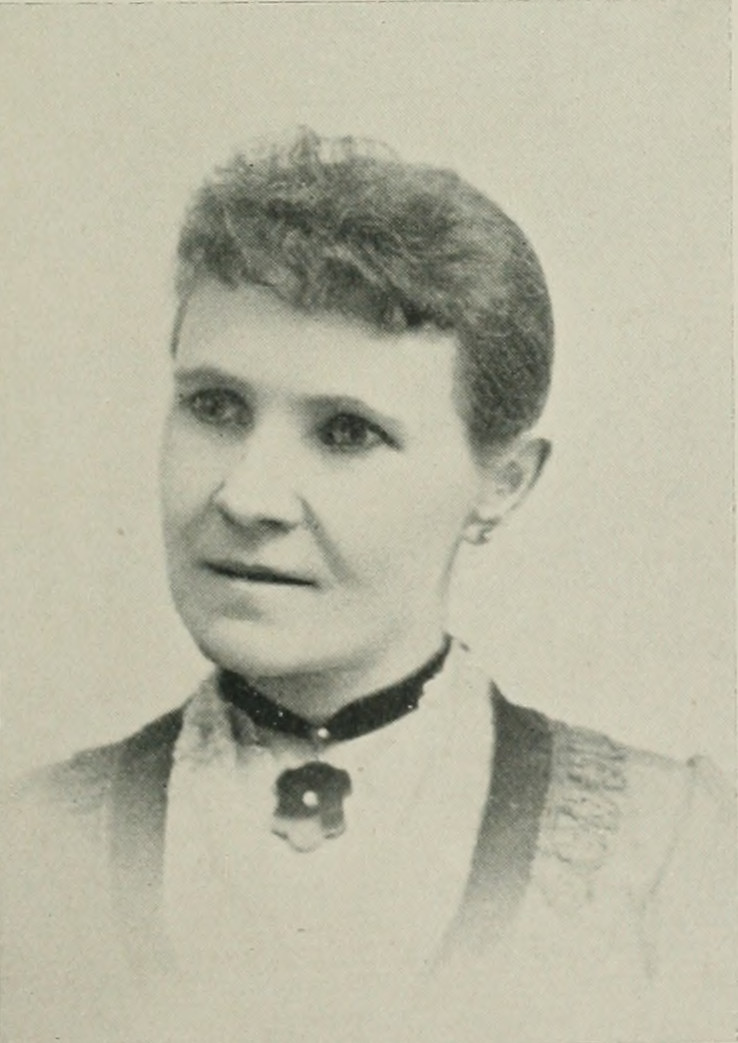
- Photo in A Woman of the Century"
- Born: Marthena Funkhouser; July 26, 1845; Terre Haute, Indiana, U.S.
- Died: June 29, 1913 (aged 67); Indianapolis, Indiana, U.S.
- Resting place: Highland Lawn Cemetery, Terre Haute, Indiana
- Occupation: poet
- Spouse: Benjamin Franklin Swafford (m. 1862; died 1900)
- Writing career
- Pen name: Belle Bremer
- Notable works: Wych-elm, poems

Martina Swafford (née, Funkhouser; pen name, Belle Bremer; July 26, 1845 – June 29, 1913) was an American poet of the long nineteenth century. Widely known by her pen-name, "Belle Bremer", her vision was greatly impaired, so much so that much of the time she was unable to read or write. Swafford was a native of Indiana, and by education, environment, and primary attachments, she was an Indiana poet. Yet she called herself semi-Southern, because of her Virginian parentage and her own yearly temporary home in the South. She spent her winters at Huntsville, Alabama, a noted health resort of the time, where much of her poetry was written. It was said that the cheerful, hopeful tone of these poems, made more effective by an underlying pathos, was a pleasing contrast to the melancholy which marred the work of so many verse-makers of the time.

== Early life and education ==
Marthena Funkhouser (nickname, "Aunt Mat") was born near Terre Haute, Indiana, on July 26, 1845. Her parents, John G. Funkhouser and Mary E "Polly" Martin, were Virginians. Her father, of German ancestry, was a large farmer of Vigo County, Indiana. Her mother was of English descent.

Each year, Swafford spent part of her time in the South, generally passing the winters in Huntsville. She received a liberal education, which she supplemented by extensive reading and study.

Swafford's health was delicate and she suffered from optical weakness, which at times made her unable to read.

== Career ==
Letters, a poetic quote

I have brought them from their hiding,
Where they've lain these many years,
And have tried to read them over,
But I cannot for the tears.

At an early age, her poems were ranked with the foremost of the rising authors of the Wabash Valley. Her first literary work was stories for the Philadelphia "Saturday Evening Post." She became a contributor to "Peterson's Magazine" and other periodicals, and her poems were extensively read and copied. The Atlanta "Constitution" introduced her to its extended southern constituency, and some of her best work appeared in that journal. Much of her work was done during her winter residence in Huntsville. She belongs to the romantic rather than to the aesthetic school of poetry, though her verse was characterized by melody and a noticeable artistic treatment. Her muse was preëminently heroic and ideal, as her subjects generally indicated. She wrote of "The Norse King," "The Haunted Battlefield," "The Hesperides," "When My Ship Comes In," and other like matters, which appealed to the imagination of the reader. Among her most warmly-esteemed Southern literary friends was Henry W. Grady. She published one volume of poems, entitled Wych Elm (Buffalo, 1891).

Swafford was a charter member of the Western Association of Writers.

== Personal life ==
On May 8, 1862, she married Benjamin Franklin Swafford (died 1900), a prominent physician in Terre Haute. Her home was a social and literary center, and her time was devoted to good works and literature. She died June 29, 1913, in Indianapolis, and she was buried at Highland Lawn Cemetery in Terre Haute.

== Selected works ==
- Wych-elm, poems, 1891
