= Rose Porter =

American novelist

Rose Porter (December 6, 1845 – September 10, 1906) was an American religious novelist who wrote or edited more than 70 books.

== Biography ==
Porter was born in New York, New York, December 6, 1845. Her father, David Collins Porter, was a wealthy New Yorker. He died in 1845, while Rose was an infant. Her mother, Rose Anne Hardy, was the daughter of an English army officer. Porter's early years were spent in New York and in the family's summer home in Catskills-on-the-Hudson. She was educated in New York, with the exception of a year abroad. After completing her education, she and her mother made their home in New Haven, Connecticut. After the mother died, Porter kept her home in New Haven, where she lived with her servants.

Porter's first success was Summer Drift-Wood for the Winter Fire (1870). Notwithstanding the fact that she was an invalid for years, Porter was a writer of quiet religious romance, publishing or editing 70 volumes. She also wrote or edited prayer books, devotional exercises, and compilations of material for calendars and diaries.

Rose Porter died in New Haven, Connecticut, September 10, 1906.

== Selected works ==
- Summer Drift-Wood for the Winter Fire (1870) (text)
- Foundations: Or, Castles in the Air (1871) (text)
- The Winter Fire: A Sequel to "Summer Drift-wood". (1874) (text)
- The Years that are Told (1875) (text)
- A Song and a Sigh (1877) (text)
- In the Mist (1879) (text)
- Charity, Sweet Charity (1880) (text)
- The Years that are Told (1881)
- Resting in His Love: (series * of "Rest a While.") (1890) (text)
- Gain by Loss, Or, The Garment of Praise (1891) (text)
- Saint Martin's Summer: Or, The Romance of the Cliff (1891) (text)
- Thoughts for Men: From American Statesmen(1893) (text)
- My Son's Wife (1895) (text)
- One of the Sweet Old Chapters: A Fragment (1896) (text)
- A Daughter of Israel (1899) (text)
- In quietness and in confidence; Open window; Resting in His love; Looking toward sunrise; A year of blessings and blessed year (1907)
