= The Chainbearer =

1845 novel by James Fenimore Cooper

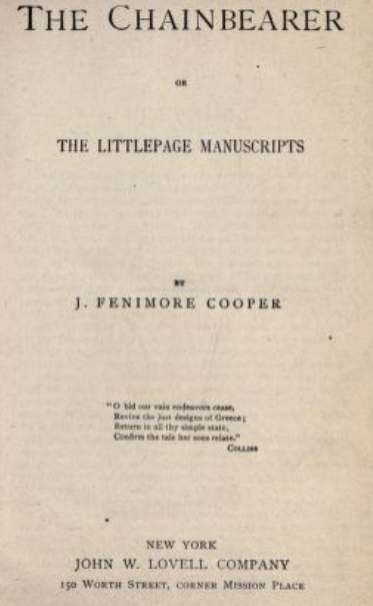
- Author: James Fenimore Cooper
- Language: English
- Genre: Novel
- Publication date: 1845
- Publication place: United States
- Preceded by: Satanstoe
- Followed by: The Redskins

The Chainbearer; or The Littlepage Manuscripts is a novel by the American novelist James Fenimore Cooper first published in 1845. The Chainbearer is the second book in a trilogy starting with Satanstoe and ending with The Redskins. The novel focuses mainly on issues of land ownership and the displacement of American Indians as the United States moves Westward.

== Themes ==
Critical to the trilogy is the sense of expansion through the measuring and acquisition of land by civilization. The title The Chainbearer represents "the man who carries the chains in measuring the land, the man who helps civilization to grow from the wilderness, but who at the same time continues the chain of evil, increases the potentiality for corruption." Chainbearers, also known as "chain men", were important figures in early America because the accuracy of surveys depended on their work, and they were often required to be sworn in before performing their duties. The central position of the "Chainbearer" allows Cooper to deal with the cultural lack of understanding that Native Americans had of European concepts of land ownership. This in turn allows Cooper to critique ownership in general.

Also, Cooper, like in many of his novels, focuses on the growing corruption of individuals in "civilization" as it expands. This Cooper attributes "an inherent principle in the corrupt nature of man to misuse all his privileges. . . . If history proves anything, it proves this." Two characters, in particular, represent this growing corruption of civilization, Andries Mordaunt, the chainbearer, and Aaron, known as "Thousandacres". The men represent different types of the civilization, Mordaunt as the usurper of old civilization and Thousandacres representing an older society which the new "civilization" means to usurp. Eventually this new civilization decides to embrace force in order to lay full claim on the land. This displacement of Native Americans by the ever expansionist Americans repeatedly becomes an issue for Cooper throughout the trilogy of novels. In so doing, Cooper presents a very strong critique of Americans and America.

The German author Arno Schmidt, who translated several of Cooper's novels, has a character in his eccentrically punctuated novel Zettels Traum state, "if His ›Littlepage-Trilogy‹ were more familiar, We could, by analogous filological=antiquarian efforts, re=construct from Him, the entire US=world, from 1750 to 1840, ('nd not all=that uncolorfully, either!)."
