= Alexander Anderson (poet) =

Scottish poet (1845–1909)

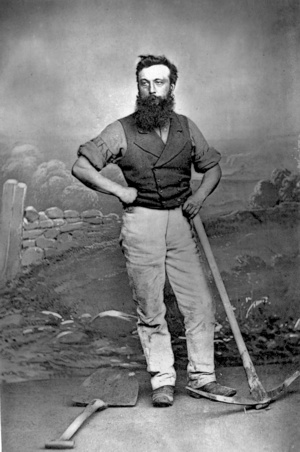
- Born: 30 April 1845; Kirkconnel, Dumfries and Galloway, Scotland, United Kingdom
- Died: 11 July 1909 (aged 64)
- Occupations: poet, librarian

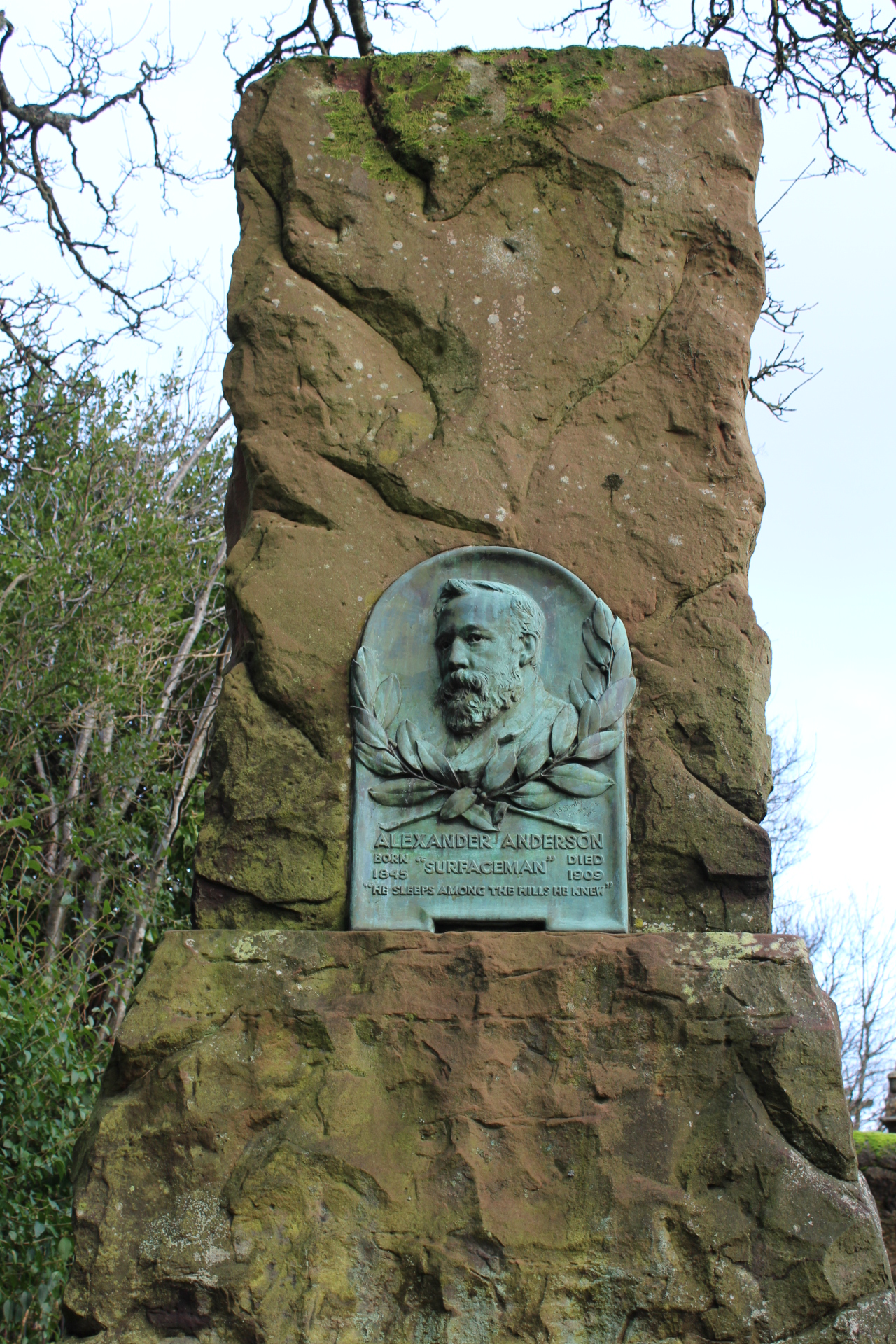
Alexander Anderson, Kirkconnel

Alexander Anderson (30 April 1845 – 11 July 1909) was a Scottish poet.

== Biography ==
Born in Kirkconnel, Dumfries and Galloway, Scotland, the sixth and youngest son of James Anderson, a quarrier. When he was three, the household moved to Crocketford in Kirkcudbrightshire. He attended the local school, where the teacher found him to be of average ability. The area around Crocketford was renowned for martyrdom, and Anderson seems to have taken inspiration from his walks in the hills in his later poetry. At 16, he was back in his native village working in a quarry; some two years later (1862), he became a surfaceman or platelayer on the Glasgow and South-Western Railway, and generally wrote under the name of Surfaceman.

Spending all his leisure in self-culture, he mastered German, French, and Spanish sufficiently to read the chief masterpieces in these languages. Anderson was published in periodicals such as Good Words and Chambers's Edinburgh Journal numerous times from 1871 until 1890. His poetic vein, which was true if somewhat limited in range, soon manifested itself, and in 1870 he began to send verses to the 'People's Friend' of Dundee Subsequently his first book 'A Song of Labour and other Poems', was published in 1873 by the Dundee Advertiser in a run of 1000. Thanks to the support of The People's Friend, this issue sold out within a fortnight. The Rev. George Gilfillan, a poetry critic in Dundee, also aided him with his support. Gilfillan wrote to Thomas Aird, "You will be greatly interested in his simple manner and appearance, unspoiled Burns is in these respects and not without a little real mens divinor. Of course, you know his poetry and his remarkable history". and there followed Two Angels (1875), Songs of the Rail (1878), and Ballads and Sonnets (1879). In the following year, he was made assistant librarian in the University of Edinburgh. After an interval as secretary to the Philosophical Institution there, he returned as chief librarian to the university. Thereafter, he wrote little. Of a simple and gentle character, he made many friends, including the Duke of Argyll, Thomas Carlyle, and Lord Houghton.

A famous poem of his is "Cuddle Doon".

Anderson died on 11 July 1909 in Edinburgh.

== Works ==
- A Song of Labour, and other poems, 1873. Dundee
- The Two Angels, and other poems With an introductory sketch by Rev. G. Gilfillan. 1875. London
- Songs of the Rail 1878. London
- Ballads and Sonnets. 1879. London
- Later Poems of Alexander Anderson, "Surfaceman." Edited, with a biographical sketch, by Alexander Brown. 1912.
