= O Captain! My Captain! =

Poem by Walt Whitman on the death of Abraham Lincoln

- by Walt Whitman
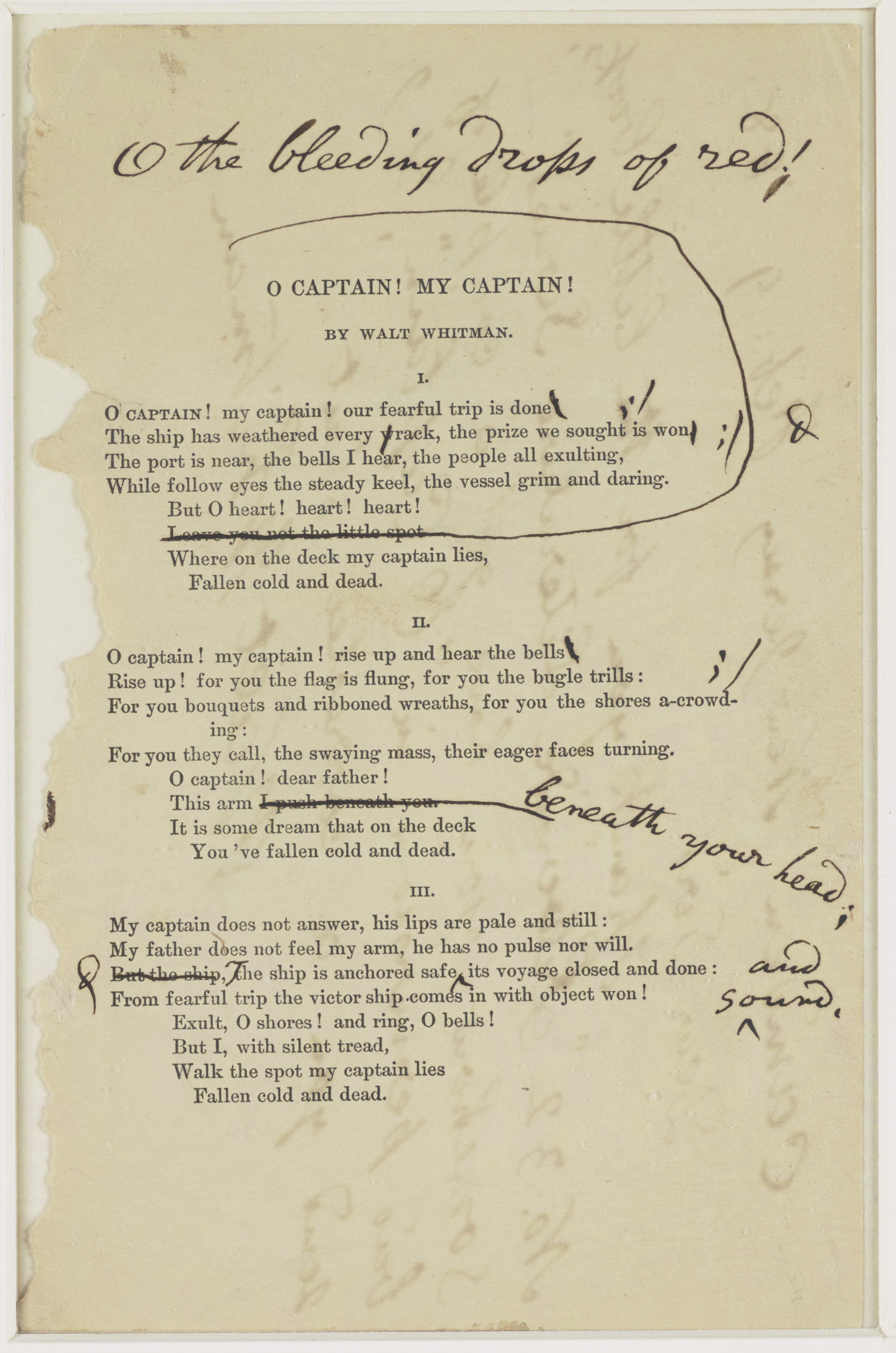
- Printed copy of "O Captain! My Captain!" with revision notes by Whitman, 1888
- Written: 1865
- First published in: The Saturday Press
- Subject(s): Abraham Lincoln, American Civil War
- Form: Extended metaphor
- Publication date: November 4, 1865

Full text
- O Captain! My Captain! at Wikisource

"O Captain! My Captain!" is an extended metaphor poem written by Walt Whitman in 1865 about the death of U.S. president Abraham Lincoln. Well received upon publication, the poem was Whitman's first to be anthologized and the most popular during his lifetime. Together with "When Lilacs Last in the Dooryard Bloom'd", "Hush'd Be the Camps To-Day", and "This Dust Was Once the Man", it is one of four poems written by Whitman about the death of Lincoln.

During the American Civil War, Whitman moved to Washington, D.C., where he worked for the government and volunteered at hospitals. Although he never met Lincoln, Whitman felt a connection to him and was greatly moved by Lincoln's assassination. "My Captain" was first published in The Saturday Press on November 4, 1865, and appeared in Sequel to Drum-Taps later that year. He later included it in the collection Leaves of Grass and recited the poem at several lectures on Lincoln's death.

Stylistically, the poem is uncharacteristic of Whitman's poetry because of its rhyming, song-like flow, and simple "ship of state" metaphor. These elements likely contributed to the poem's initial positive reception and popularity, with many celebrating it as one of the greatest American works of poetry. Critical opinion has shifted since the mid-20th century, with some scholars deriding it as conventional and unoriginal. The poem has made several appearances in popular culture; as it never mentions Lincoln, it has been invoked upon the death of several other heads of state. It is famously featured in Dead Poets Society (1989) and is frequently associated with the star of that film, Robin Williams.

== Background ==
Walt Whitman established his reputation as a poet in the late 1850s to early 1860s with the 1855 release of Leaves of Grass. Whitman intended to write a distinctly American epic and developed a free verse style inspired by the cadences of the King James Bible. The brief volume, first released in 1855, was considered controversial by some, with critics particularly objecting to Whitman's blunt depictions of sexuality and the poem's "homoerotic overtones". Whitman's work received significant attention following praise for Leaves of Grass by American transcendentalist lecturer and essayist Ralph Waldo Emerson.

At the start of the American Civil War, Whitman moved from New York to Washington, D.C., where he held a series of government jobs—first with the Army Paymaster's Office and later with the Bureau of Indian Affairs. He volunteered in the army hospitals as a nurse. Whitman's poetry was informed by his wartime experience, maturing into reflections on death and youth, the brutality of war, and patriotism. Whitman's brother, Union Army soldier George Washington Whitman, was taken prisoner in Virginia in September 1864, and held for five months in Libby Prison, a Confederate prisoner-of-war camp near Richmond. On February 24, 1865, George was granted a furlough to return home because of his poor health, and Whitman travelled to his mother's home in New York to visit his brother. While visiting Brooklyn, Whitman contracted to have his collection of Civil War poems, Drum-Taps, published. In June 1865, James Harlan, the Secretary of the Interior, found a copy of Leaves of Grass and, considering the collection vulgar, fired Whitman from the Bureau of Indian Affairs.

=== Whitman and Lincoln ===
Although they never met, Whitman saw Abraham Lincoln several times between 1861 and 1865, sometimes at close quarters. The first time was when Lincoln stopped in New York City in 1861 on his way to Washington. Whitman noticed the president-elect's "striking appearance" and "unpretentious dignity", and trusted Lincoln's "supernatural tact" and "idiomatic Western genius". He admired the president, writing in October 1863: "I love the President personally." Whitman considered himself and Lincoln to be "afloat in the same stream" and "rooted in the same ground". Whitman and Lincoln shared similar views on slavery and the Union, and similarities have been noted in their literary styles and inspirations. Whitman later declared: "Lincoln gets almost nearer me than anybody else."

There is an account of Lincoln's reading Whitman's Leaves of Grass poetry collection in his office, and another of the president's saying "Well, he looks like a man," upon seeing Whitman in Washington, D.C. According to scholar John Matteson: "[t]he truth of both these stories is hard to establish." Lincoln's death on April 15, 1865, greatly moved Whitman, who wrote several poems in tribute to the fallen president. "O Captain! My Captain!", "When Lilacs Last in the Dooryard Bloom'd", "Hush'd Be the Camps To-Day", and "This Dust Was Once the Man" were all written on Lincoln's death. While these poems do not specifically mention Lincoln, they turn the assassination of the president into a sort of martyrdom.

== Text ==
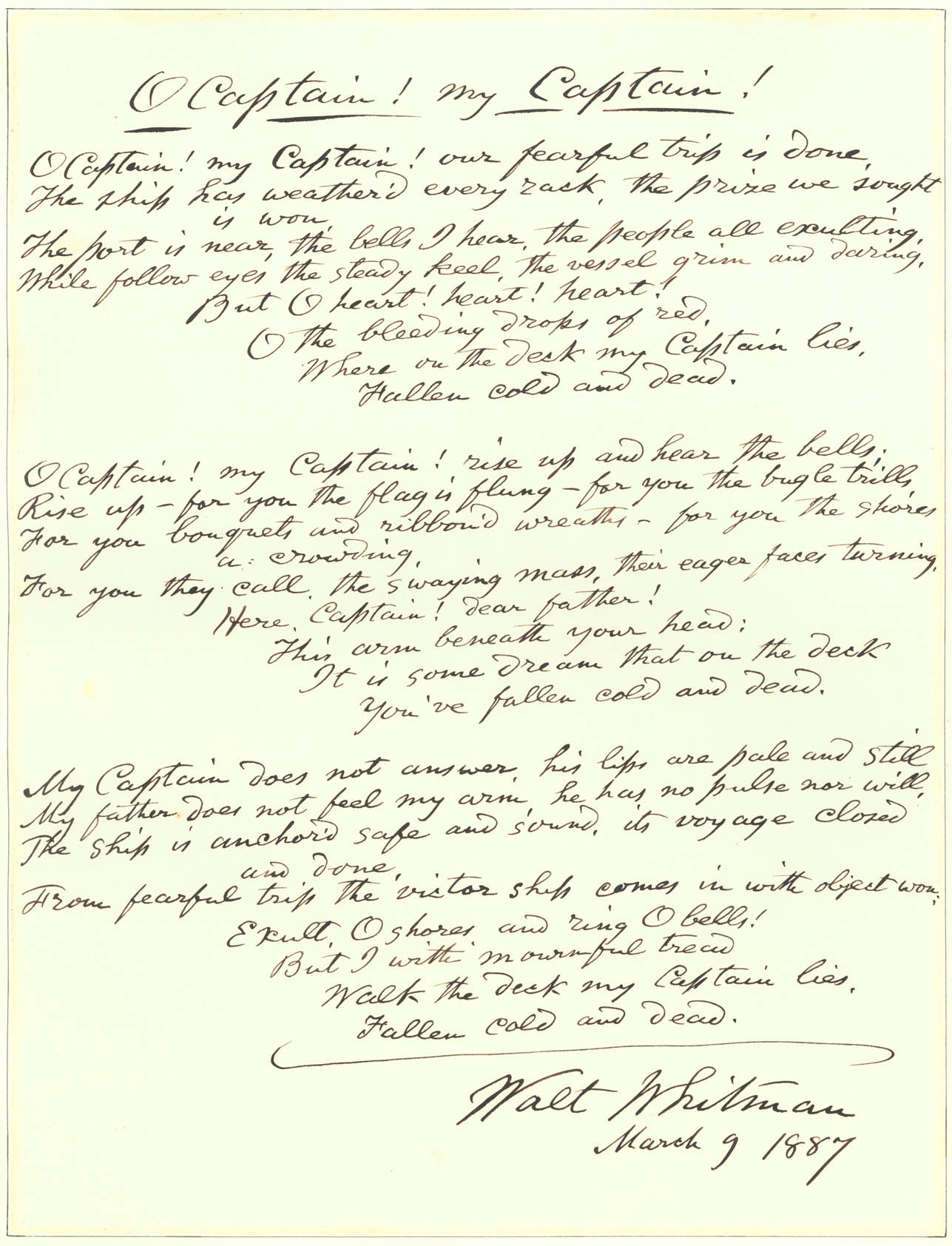
Autographed fair copy of Whitman's poem—signed and dated March 9, 1887—as published in 1881

O Captain! My Captain! our fearful trip is done;
The ship has weather'd every rack, the prize we sought is won;
The port is near, the bells I hear, the people all exulting,
While follow eyes the steady keel, the vessel grim and daring:
But O heart! heart! heart!
O the bleeding drops of red, (Note: Originally "Not you the little spot")
Where on the deck my Captain lies,
Fallen cold and dead.

O Captain! My Captain! rise up and hear the bells;
Rise up—for you the flag is flung—for you the bugle trills;
For you bouquets and ribbon'd wreaths—for you the shores a-crowding;
For you they call, the swaying mass, their eager faces turning;
Here captain! dear father!
This arm beneath your head; (Note: Originally "This arm I push beneath you")
It is some dream that on the deck,
You've fallen cold and dead.

My Captain does not answer, his lips are pale and still;
My father does not feel my arm, he has no pulse nor will;
The ship is anchor'd safe and sound, its voyage closed and done;
From fearful trip, the victor ship, comes in with object won;
Exult, O shores, and ring, O bells!
But I, with mournful tread,
Walk the deck my captain lies, (Note: Originally "Walk the spot my captain lies")
Fallen cold and dead.

== Publication history ==
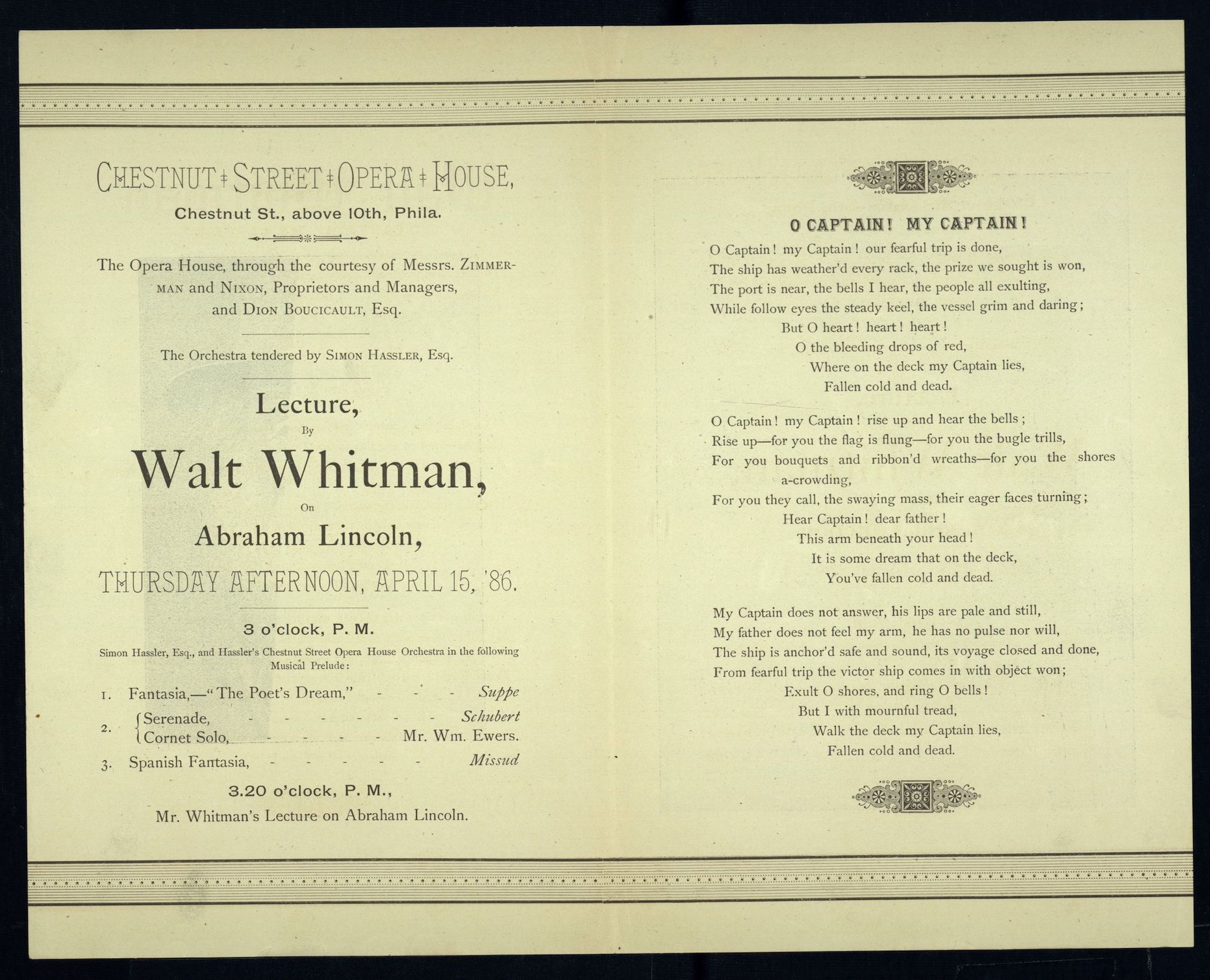
Whitman's lecture on Lincoln, invitation, 1886

Literary critic Helen Vendler thinks it likely that Whitman wrote the poem before "When Lilacs Last in the Dooryard Bloom'd", considering it a direct response to "Hush'd Be the Camps To-Day". An early draft of the poem is written in free verse. "My Captain" was first published in The Saturday Press on November 4, 1865. (Note: The Saturday Press shut down around two weeks after publishing the poem.) Around the same time, it was included in Whitman's book, Sequel to Drum-Taps—publication in The Saturday Press was considered a "teaser" for the book. Although Sequel to Drum-Taps was first published in early October 1865, the copies were not ready for distribution until December. The first publication of the poem had different punctuation than Whitman intended, and he corrected before its next publication. It was also included in the 1867 edition of Leaves of Grass. Whitman revised the poem several times during his life, including in his 1871 collection Passage to India. Its final republication by Whitman was in the 1881 edition of Leaves of Grass.

Whitman's friend Horace Traubel wrote in his book With Walt Whitman in Camden that Whitman read a newspaper article that said "If Walt Whitman had written a volume of My Captains instead of filling a scrapbasket with waste and calling it a book the world would be better off today and Walt Whitman would have some excuse for living." Whitman responded to the article on September 11, 1888, saying: "Damn My Captain ... I'm almost sorry I ever wrote the poem," though he admitted that it "had certain emotional immediate reasons for being". In the 1870s and 1880s, Whitman gave several lectures over eleven years on Lincoln's death. He usually began or ended the lectures by reciting "My Captain", despite his growing prominence meaning he could have read a different poem. In the late 1880s, Whitman earned money by selling autographed copies of "My Captain"—purchasers included John Hay, Charles Aldrich, and S. Weir Mitchell.

== Style ==
The poem rhymes using an AABBCDED rhyme scheme, and is designed for recitation. It is written in nine quatrains, organized in three stanzas. Each stanza has two quatrains of four seven-beat lines, followed by a four-line refrain, which changes slightly from stanza to stanza, in a tetrameter/trimeter ballad beat. Historian Daniel Mark Epstein wrote in 2004 that he considers the structure of the poem to be "uncharacteristically mechanical, formulaic". He described the poem as a conventional ballad, comparable to Samuel Taylor Coleridge's writing in "The Rime of the Ancient Mariner" and much of Alfred, Lord Tennyson's work, especially "In Memoriam A.H.H." Literary critic Jerome Loving wrote to the opposite effect in 1999, saying that the structure gave "My Captain" a "sing-song" quality, evocative of folk groups like the Hutchinson Family Singers and Cheney Family Singers. The scholar Ted Genoways argued that the poem retains distinctive features characteristic to Whitman, such as varying line length. Whitman very rarely wrote poems that rhymed; (Note: "My Captain", "The Singer in the Prison" (1869), and "Ethiopia Saluting the Colors" (1871) are considered Whitman's most 'conventional' works.) in a review contemporary to Whitman, The Atlantic suggested that Whitman was rising "above himself" by writing a poem unlike his others. The writer elaborated that, while his previous work had represented "unchecked nature", the rhymes of "My Captain" were a sincere expression of emotion.

The author Frances Winwar argued in her 1941 book American Giant: Walt Whitman and His Times that "in the simple ballad rhythm beat the heart of the folk". Vendler concludes that Whitman's use of a simple style is him saying that "soldiers and sailors have a right to verse written for them". Using elements of popular poetry enabled Whitman to create a poem that he felt would be understood by the general public. In 2009, academic Amanda Gailey argued that Whitman—who, writing the poem, had just been fired from his government job—adopted a conventional style to attract a wider audience. She added that Whitman wrote to heal the nation, crafting a poem the country would find "ideologically and aesthetically satisfactory". William Pannapacker, a literature professor, similarly described the poem in 2004 as a "calculated critical and commercial success". In 2003, the author Daniel Aaron wrote that "Death enshrined the Commoner [Lincoln], [and] Whitman placed himself and his work in the reflected limelight". As an elegy to Lincoln, the English professor Faith Barrett wrote in 2005 that the style makes it "timeless", following in the tradition of elegies like "Lycidas" and "Adonais".

== Reception ==
The poem was Whitman's most popular during his lifetime, and the only one to be anthologized before his death. The historian Michael C. Cohen noted that "My Captain" was "carried beyond the limited circulation of Leaves of Grass and into the popular heart"; its popularity remade "history in the form of a ballad". Initial reception to the poem was very positive. In early 1866, a reviewer in the Boston Commonwealth wrote that the poem was the most moving dirge for Lincoln ever written, adding that Drum Taps "will do much [...] to remove the prejudice against Mr. Whitman in many minds". Similarly, after reading Sequel to Drum Taps, the author William Dean Howells became convinced that Whitman had cleaned the "old channels of their filth" and poured "a stream of blameless purity" through; he would become a prominent defender of Whitman. One of the earliest criticisms of the poem was authored by Edward P. Mitchell in 1881 who considered the rhymes "crude". "My Captain" is considered uncharacteristic of Whitman's poetry, and it was praised initially as a departure from his typical style. Author Julian Hawthorne wrote in 1891 that the poem was touching partially because it was such a stylistic departure. In 1892, The Atlantic wrote that "My Captain" was universally accepted as Whitman's "one great contribution to the world's literature", and George Rice Carpenter, a scholar and biographer of Whitman, said in 1903 that the poem was possibly the best work of Civil War poetry, praising its imagery as "beautiful".

Reception remained positive into the early 20th century. Epstein considers it to have been one of the ten most popular English language poems of the 20th century. In his book Canons by Consensus, Joseph Csicsila reached a similar conclusion, noting that the poem was "one of the two or three most highly praised of Whitman's poems during the 1920s and 1930s"; he also wrote that the poem's verse form and emotional sincerity appealed to "more conservative-minded critics". In 1916, Henry B. Rankin, a biographer of Lincoln, wrote that "My Captain" became "the nation's—aye, the world's—funeral dirge of our First American". The Literary Digest in 1919 deemed it the "most likely to live forever" of Whitman's poems, and the 1936 book American Life in Literature went further, describing it as the best American poem. Author James O'Donnell Bennett echoed that, writing that the poem represented a perfect "threnody", or mourning poem. The poem was not unanimously praised during this period: one critic wrote that "My Captain" was "more suitable for recitation before an enthusiastically uncritical audience than for its place in the Oxford Book of English Verse".

Beginning in the 1920s, Whitman became increasingly respected by critics, and by 1950 he was one of the most prominent American authors. Poetry anthologies began to include poetry that was considered more "authentic" to Whitman's poetic style, and, as a result, "My Captain" became less popular. In an analysis of poetry anthologies, Joseph Csicsila found that, although "My Captain" had been Whitman's most frequently published poem, shortly after the end of World War II it "all but disappeared" from American anthologies, and had "virtually disappeared" after 1966. William E. Barton wrote in Abraham Lincoln and Walt Whitman, published in 1965, that the poem was "the least like Whitman of anything Whitman ever wrote; yet it is his highest literary monument".

Critical opinion of the poem began to shift in the middle of the 20th century. In 1980, Whitman's biographer Justin Kaplan called the poem "thoroughly conventional". The literary critic F. O. Matthiessen criticized the poem, writing in 1941 that its early popularity was an "ample and ironic comment" on how Whitman's more authentic poetry could not reach a wide audience. Michael C. Cohen, a literature professor, said Matthiessen's writing exemplified 20th-century opinion on the poem. In the 1997 book A Reader's Guide to Walt Whitman, scholar Gay Wilson Allen concluded that the poem's symbols were "trite", the rhythm "artificial", and the rhymes "erratic".

Negative perspectives on the poem continued into the 21st century. In 2000, Helen Vendler wrote that because Whitman "was bent on registering individual response as well as the collective wish expressed in 'Hush'd be the camps', he took on the voice of a single representative sailor silencing his own idiosyncratic voice". Elsewhere, she states that two "stylistic features—its meter and its use of refrain—mark 'O Captain' as a designedly democratic and populist poem". Four years later, Epstein wrote that he struggled to believe that the same writer wrote both "Lilacs" and "O Captain! My Captain!". Poet Robert Pinsky told the New York Times News Service in 2009 that he considered the poem "not very good", and a year later another poet, C. K. Williams, concluded that the poem was a "truly awful piece of near doggerel triteness" that deserved derisive criticism. Meanwhile, the 2004 Oxford Encyclopedia of American Literature entry on Whitman suggests that critiques about the poem's rhythm are unfair.

== Themes ==
Academic Stefan Schöberlein writes that—with the exception of Helen Vendler's work—the poem's sentimentality has resulted in it being mostly "ignored in English speaking academia". Vendler writes that the poem utilizes elements of war journalism, such as "the bleeding drops of red" and "fallen cold and dead". The poem has imagery relating to the sea throughout. Genoways considers the best "turn of phrase" in the poem to be line 12, where Whitman describes a "swaying mass", evocative of both a funeral and religious service.

The poem's nautical references allude to Admiral Nelson's victory and death at the Battle of Trafalgar.

=== "Ship of state" metaphor ===
The poem describes the United States as a ship, a metaphor that Whitman had previously used in "Death in the School-Room". This metaphor of a ship of state has been often used by authors. Whitman himself had written a letter on March 19, 1863, that compared the head of state to a ship's captain. Whitman had also likely read newspaper reports that Lincoln had dreamed of a ship under full sail the night before his assassination; the imagery was allegedly a recurring dream of Lincoln's before significant moments in his life.

"My Captain" begins by describing Lincoln as the captain of the nation. By the end of the first stanza, Lincoln has become America's "dear father" as his death is revealed ("fallen cold and dead"). Vendler writes that the poem is told from the point of view of a young Union recruit, a "sailor-boy" who considers Lincoln like a "dear father". The American Civil War is almost over and "the prize we sought is almost won;/the port is almost near" with crowds awaiting the ship's arrival. Then, Lincoln is shot and dies. Vendler notes that in the first two stanzas the narrator is speaking to the dead captain, addressing him as "you". In the third stanza, he switches to reference Lincoln in the third person ("My captain does not answer"). Winwar describes the "roused voice of the people, incredulous at first, then tragically convinced that their Captain lay fallen". Even as the poem mourns Lincoln, there is a sense of triumph that the ship of state has completed its journey. Whitman encapsulates grief over Lincoln's death in one individual, the narrator of the poem.

Cohen argues that the metaphor serves to "mask the violence of the Civil War" and project "that concealment onto the exulting crowds". He concluded that the poem "abstracted the war into social affect and collective sentiment, converting public violence into a memory of shared loss by remaking history in the shape of a ballad".

=== Religious imagery ===
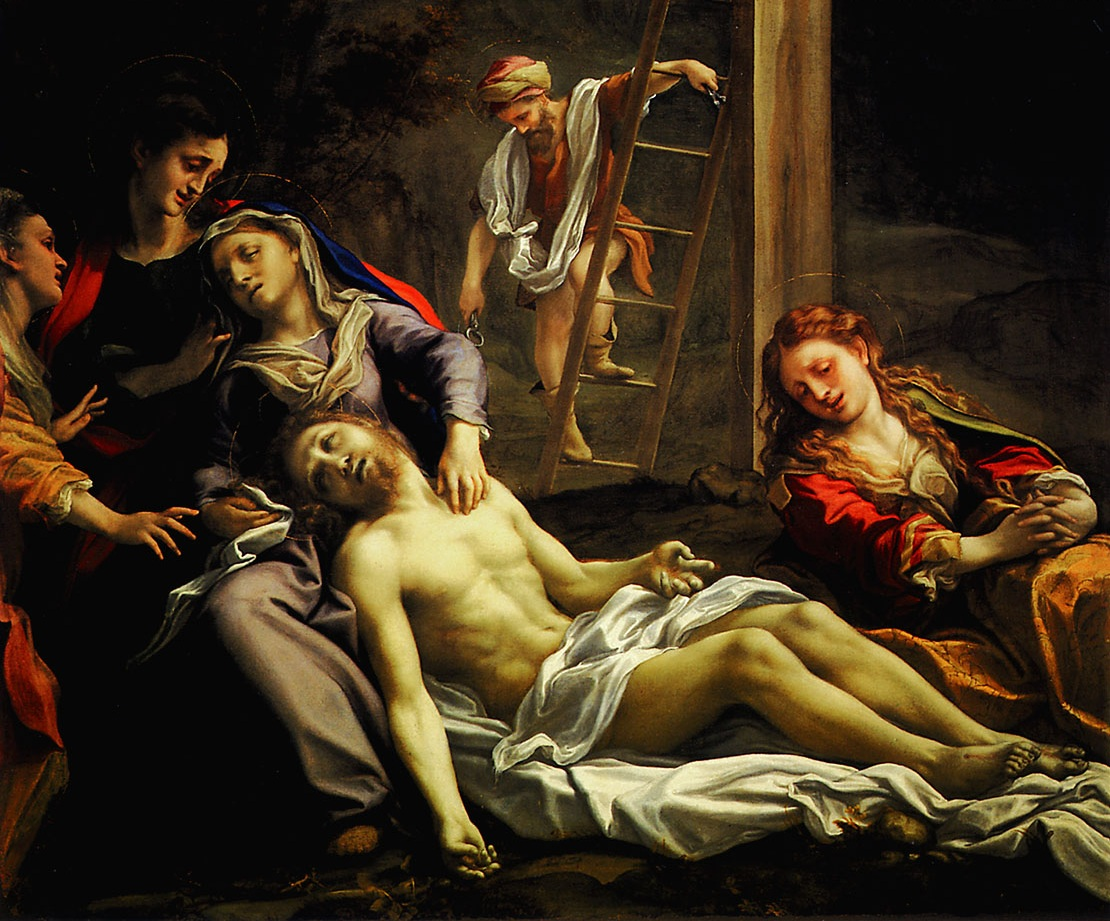
Correggio's 1525 Deposition

In the second and third stanzas, according to Schöberlein, Whitman invokes religious imagery, making Lincoln a "messianic figure". Schöberlein compares the imagery of "My Captain" to the Lamentation of Christ, specifically Correggio's 1525 Deposition. The poem's speaker places its "arm beneath [Lincoln's] head" in the same way that "Mary cradled Jesus" after his crucifixion. With Lincoln's death, "the sins of America are absolved into a religio-sentimental, national family".

== In popular culture ==
The poem, which never mentions Lincoln by name, has frequently been invoked following the deaths of a head of state. After Franklin D. Roosevelt died in 1945, actor Charles Laughton read "O Captain! My Captain!" during a memorial radio broadcast. When John F. Kennedy was assassinated on November 22, 1963, "O Captain! My Captain!" was played on many radio stations, extending the 'ship of state' metaphor to Kennedy. Following the 1995 assassination of Israeli Prime Minister Yitzhak Rabin, the poem was translated into Hebrew and put to music by Naomi Shemer.

The poem was set to music by David Broza and the song was released on his album Stone Doors. The poem was also set to music by Kurt Weill as one of his "Four Walt Whitman Songs".

The poem appears in the 1989 American film Dead Poets Society. John Keating (played by Robin Williams), an English teacher at the Welton Academy boarding school, introduces his students to the poem in their first class. Keating is later fired from the school. As Keating returns to collect his belongings, the students stand on their desks and address Keating as "O Captain! My Captain!" The use of "My Captain" in the film is considered "ironic" by UCLA literature professor Michael C. Cohen because the students are taking a stand against "repressive conformity" but using a poem intentionally written to be conventional.

In the 21st century, "My Captain" has continued to be quoted often, including on social media. After Robin Williams' suicide in 2014, the hashtag "#ocaptainmycaptain" began trending on Twitter and fans paid tribute to Williams by recreating the "O Captain! My Captain!" scene. Luke Buckmaster, a film critic, wrote in The Guardian that "some people, maybe even most people, now associate Whitman's verse first and foremost with a movie rather than a poem". The title of the poem was also often quoted on Twitter as US President Barack Obama left office and the office transitioned to Donald Trump.

== See also ==
- Cultural depictions of Abraham Lincoln

== General and cited sources ==
- Aaron, Daniel (2003). The Unwritten War: American Writers and the Civil War. Tuscaloosa, Alabama: University of Alabama Press. ISBN 978-0-8173-5002-4.
- Allen, Gay Wilson (1997). A Reader's Guide to Walt Whitman. Syracuse, NY: Syracuse University Press. pp. 86, 197. ISBN 978-0-8156-0488-4.
- Barton, William E. (1965) [1928]. Abraham Lincoln and Walt Whitman. Port Washington, NY: Kennikat Press. ISBN 9780804600187. OCLC 1145780794.
- Barrett, Faith (Winter 2005). "Addresses to a Divided Nation: Images of War in Emily Dickinson and Walt Whitman". Arizona Quarterly: A Journal of American Literature, Culture, and Theory. 61 (4): 67–99. doi:10.1353/arq.2005.0005. ISSN 1558-9595. S2CID 161131368.
- Bennett, James O'Donnell (1927). Much Loved Books: Best Sellers of the Ages. New York: Boni and Liveright: Publishers. pp. 339–351. OCLC 1374171.
- Blodgett, Harold W. (1953). The Best of Whitman. New York: Ronald Press Company. ISBN 978-0871409799. OCLC 938884255.
- Brown, Robert J. (2004). Manipulating the Ether: The Power of Broadcast Radio in Thirties America. Jefferson, North Carolina: McFarland. ISBN 978-0-7864-2066-7.
- Callow, Philip (1992). From Noon to Starry Night: A Life of Walt Whitman. Chicago: Ivan R. Dee. ISBN 1566631335. OCLC 644050069.
- Csicsila, Joseph (2004). "Nineteenth-Century Poetry: Whitman, Dickinson, Alice Cary, Phoebe Cary, Larcom, Thaxter, Lanier, Tabb". Canons by Consensus: Critical Trends and American Literature Anthologies. Tuscaloosa, Alabama: University of Alabama Press. pp. 55–85. ISBN 978-0-8173-8178-3. OCLC 320324064.
- Cohen, Michael C. (2015). The Social Lives of Poems in Nineteenth-Century America. Philadelphia: University of Pennsylvania Press. ISBN 978-0-8122-9131-5.
- Coyle, William (1962). The Poet and the President: Whitman's Lincoln Poems. New York: Odyssey Press. OCLC 2591078.
- Donaldson, Thomas (1896). Walt Whitman the Man. New York: Francis P. Harper. ISBN 9780841418837. OCLC 217422. Reprint: Folcroft, Pa.: Folcroft Library Editions, 1973. ISBN 9780841418837.
- Dimare, Philip C. (2011). Movies in American History: An Encyclopedia. Santa Barbara, California: ABC-CLIO. ISBN 978-1-59884-296-8. OCLC 741122834.
- Eiselein, Gregory (1998). "'O Captain! My Captain!' (1865)". In LeMaster, J. R.; Kummings, Donald D. (eds.). The Routledge Encyclopedia of Walt Whitman: An Encyclopedia. New York: Routledge. p. 473. ISBN 978-0815318767. OCLC 921221885.
- Epstein, Daniel Mark (2004). Lincoln and Whitman: Parallel Lives in Civil War Washington (1st ed.). New York: Ballantine Books. ISBN 0-345-45799-4. OCLC 52980509.
- Gailey, Amanda (2006). "The Publishing History of Leaves of Grass". In Kummings, Donald D. (ed.). A Companion to Walt Whitman. Hoboken, New Jersey: John Wiley & Sons. pp. 409–438. ISBN 978-1-4051-2093-7.
- Genoways, Ted (2006). "Civil War Poems in 'Drum-Taps' and 'Memories of President Lincoln'". In Kummings, Donald D. (ed.). A Companion to Walt Whitman. Hoboken, New Jersey: John Wiley & Sons. pp. 522–537. ISBN 978-1-4051-2093-7.
- Hubbell, Jay B., ed. (1936). American Life in Literature. New York: Harper. OCLC 977322422.
- Kaplan, Justin (1980). Walt Whitman: A Life (1st ed.). New York: Simon & Schuster. ISBN 0-06-053511-3. OCLC 51984882.
- Krieg, Joann P. (2006). "Literary Contemporaries". In Kummings, Donald D. (ed.). A Companion to Walt Whitman. Hoboken, New Jersey: John Wiley & Sons. pp. 392–408. ISBN 978-1-4051-2093-7.
- Lewis, Lloyd (1994). The Assassination of Lincoln: History and Myth. Lincoln, Nebraska: University of Nebraska Press. ISBN 978-0-8032-7949-0.
- Loving, Jerome M. (1975). Civil War Letters of George Washington Whitman. Durham, North Carolina: Duke University Press. ISBN 0822303310.
- Loving, Jerome (1999). Walt Whitman: The Song of Himself. Berkeley, California: University of California Press. ISBN 0-520-21427-7. OCLC 39313629.
- Matteson, John (2021). A Worse Place Than Hell: How the Civil War Battle of Fredericksburg Changed a Nation. New York: W. W. Norton and Company. ISBN 978-0-3932-4707-7.
- Matthiessen, F. O. (1968) [1941]. American Renaissance: Art and Expression in the Age of Emerson and Whitman. New York: Oxford University Press. ISBN 978-0199726882. OCLC 640086213.
- Miller, James E. (1962). Walt Whitman. New York: Twayne Publishers. OCLC 875382711.
- Oliver, Charles M. (2005). Critical Companion to Walt Whitman: A Literary Reference to His Life and Work. New York: Infobase Publishing. ISBN 978-1-4381-0858-2.
- Pannapacker, William (2004). Revised Lives: Whitman, Religion, and Constructions of Identity in Nineteenth-Century Anglo-American Culture. New York: Routledge. ISBN 978-1-135-92451-5.
- Parini, Jay (2004). The Oxford Encyclopedia of American Literature. Oxford: Oxford University Press. ISBN 978-0-19-515653-9.
- Peck, Garrett (2015). Walt Whitman in Washington, D.C.: The Civil War and America's Great Poet. Charleston, South Carolina: The History Press. ISBN 978-1626199736.
- Podlecki, Anthony J. (2011) [1984]. The Early Greek Poets and Their Times. Vancouver, BC: University of British Columbia Press. ISBN 9780774845045. OCLC 226375239.
- Price, Kenneth; Folsom, Ed (2005). Re-Scripting Walt Whitman: An Introduction to His Life and Work. Malden, Massachusetts: Blackwell Publishing. ISBN 9781405118064. OCLC 57286147.
- Rankin, Henry Bascom (1916). Personal Recollections of Abraham Lincoln. New York: G. P. Putnam's Sons. OCLC 444414.
- Reynolds, David S. (1995). Walt Whitman's America: A Cultural Biography. New York: Vintage Books. ISBN 978-0195170092.
- Rush, Thomas D. (2012). Reality's Pen: Reflections on Family, History & Culture. Minneapolis, Minn.: Hillcrest Publishing Group. ISBN 978-1-938223-18-1.
- Schöberlein, Stefan (Summer 2018). "'From many million heart-throbs': Walt Whitman's Communitarian Sentimentalisms". College Literature. 45 (3): 449–486. doi:10.1353/lit.2018.0027. ISSN 1542-4286. S2CID 150100388.
- Traubel, Horace (1908). With Walt Whitman in Camden ...: July 16, 1888 – October 31, 1888. New York: M. Kennerley. OCLC 44547688.
- Whitman, Walt (1961). Miller, Edwin Haviland (ed.). The Correspondence. Vol. 1. New York: New York University Press. OCLC 471569564.
- Williams, Charles Kenneth (2010). On Whitman. Princeton, New Jersey: Princeton University Press. ISBN 978-1-4008-3433-4. OCLC 650307478.
