= This Dust Was Once the Man =

1871 elegiac poem by Walt Whitman about Abraham Lincoln

- by Walt Whitman
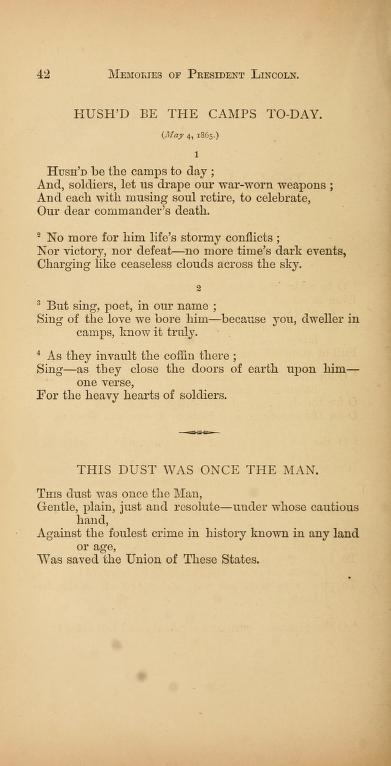
- Page 42 of the 1871 Leaves of Grass, part of the "Memories of President Lincoln" cluster, containing "This Dust Was Once the Man" and "Hush'd Be the Camps To-Day".
- Language: English
- Subject: Death of Abraham Lincoln
- Publication date: 1871

"This Dust Was Once the Man" is a brief elegy written by Walt Whitman in 1871. It was dedicated to Abraham Lincoln, the 16th president of the United States, whom Whitman greatly admired. The poem was written six years after Lincoln's assassination. Whitman had written three previous poems about Lincoln, all in 1865: "O Captain! My Captain!", "When Lilacs Last in the Dooryard Bloom'd", and "Hush'd Be the Camps To-Day".

The poem has not attracted much individual attention, though it was positively received and has been analyzed several times. The poem describes Lincoln as having saved the union of the United States from "the foulest crime in history", a line for which conflicting interpretations exist. It is generally seen as referring to either the secession of the Confederate States of America, slavery, or the assassination of Lincoln.

== Background ==
Although they never met, the poet Walt Whitman saw Abraham Lincoln, the 16th president of the United States, several times between 1861 and 1865, sometimes in close quarters. Whitman first noticed what Whitman scholar Gregory Eiselein describes as the president-elect's "striking appearance" and "unpretentious dignity". Whitman wrote that he trusted Lincoln's "supernatural tact" and "idiomatic Western genius". His admiration for Lincoln grew in the years that followed; Whitman wrote in October 1863, "I love the President personally." Whitman considered himself and Lincoln to be "afloat in the same stream" and "rooted in the same ground". Whitman and Lincoln shared similar views on slavery and the Union, and similarities have been noted in their literary styles and inspirations. Whitman later declared that "Lincoln gets almost nearer me than anybody else." As president, Lincoln led the Union through the American Civil War.

There is an account of Lincoln reading Whitman's Leaves of Grass poetry collection in his office, and another of the president saying "Well, he looks like a man!" upon seeing Whitman in Washington, D.C., but these accounts may be fictitious. Lincoln's assassination in mid-April 1865 greatly moved Whitman, who wrote several poems in tribute to the fallen president. "O Captain! My Captain!", "When Lilacs Last in the Dooryard Bloom'd", "Hush'd Be the Camps To-Day", and "This Dust Was Once the Man" were all written as sequels to Whitman's collection of poetry Drum-Taps. The poems do not specifically mention Lincoln, although they turn the assassination of the president into a sort of martyrdom.

== Text ==
This dust was once the Man,
Gentle, plain, just and resolute—under whose cautious hand,
Against the foulest crime in history known in any land or age,
Was saved the Union of These States.

== Publication history ==
Whitman wrote the poem in 1871 and published it in the "President Lincoln's Burial Hymn" cluster of Passage to India, a poetry collection intended as a supplement to Leaves of Grass. It was republished in the "Memories of President Lincoln" cluster, first in the 1871–1872 edition of Leaves of Grass. It is the only poem in this cluster that did not first appear in the poetry collections Drum-Taps or Sequel to Drum-Taps. The poem was not revised after its first publication. (Note: Whitman substantially revised portions of his poetry collection Leaves of Grass over the course of his life.)

== Analysis ==
In contrast to Whitman's earlier poems on Lincoln, which describe him as a leader, as a friend, or as "a wise and sweet soul", here he is described as simply dust. The literary critic Helen Vendler considers it Lincoln's epitaph. Whitman "grasps the dust to himself". She then argues that the epitaph is unbalanced. Half of the poem's meaning is contained in "this dust", and the following thirty words constitute the other half. She notes that dust is light, while Lincoln himself holds "complex historical weight". In the second line, Vendler notes the difference between 'gentle', which she considers a "personal" word, and the final, "official", descriptor of 'resolute'. She considers it surprising that Lincoln is never described by an active verb, but instead as primus inter pares, the 'cautious' guiding hand of the nation.

Whitman writes in the third line: "the foulest crime in history known in any land or age." The phrase "foulest crime" likely came from Herman Melville's Battle-Pieces and Aspects of the War. While Melville is generally considered to have been referring to slavery, Whitman scholar Ed Folsom wrote, in 2019, that Whitman's "foulest crime" is viewed not as slavery but either as Lincoln's assassination or the secession of the Confederate States of America; he earlier wrote that the latter interpretation was favored by Whitman scholars. After arguing in favor of the secession interpretation, Edward W. Huffstetler wrote in The Walt Whitman Encyclopedia that "This Dust" expresses Whitman's most "bitter tone" on the South. In Lincoln and The Poets, William Wilson Betts wrote in favor of the assassination of Lincoln as being the "foulest crime", and in contrast, Vendler writes that Whitman's use of "foulest crime" is a euphemism to refer to slavery. Roy Morris, a historian of the Civil War era, considers the crime to be "a heartbreaking civil war that filled the hospitals of the capital with the ruined bodies of beautiful young soldiers."

In Secular Lyric, the English professor John Michael draws comparisons between the poem and the Book of Common Prayer, saying that the poem emphasizes the "materiality of the body" and conveys grief through "understatement" by not using standard rhetorical methods to convey feeling. To Michael, referencing Lincoln's preservation of the Union makes his assassination more meaningful. Michael particularly highlights the simplicity of describing Lincoln as dust, noting that Whitman does not rely on metaphors or other poetical devices to convey Lincoln's death, as opposed to "O Captain! My Captain!" which utilizes the ship of state metaphor and makes Lincoln into a quasi-religious figure. Instead, Whitman forces the reader to face the harsh reality of death, as Lincoln has been reduced to dust.

The literary scholar Deak Nabers notes that Whitman does not mention emancipation in the epitaph and is careful not to attribute the saving of the Union to Lincoln himself, instead saying that it was preserved "under [Lincoln's] hand". Nabers draws comparisons between the poem and Melville's poem "The House-Top" and William Wells Brown's novel Clotel. The final line of the poem inverts the standard "United States was saved" to "Was saved the Union of these States", which Vendler concludes syntactically places the Union at the climax of the poem. Vendler concludes her analysis by saying that the poem has "Roman succinctness and taciturnity" and makes "dust [...] equal in weight to the salvation of the Union".

== Reception ==
In 1943, literary critic Henry Seidel Canby wrote that Whitman's poems on Lincoln have become known as "the poems of Lincoln" and noted the "fine lines" of "This Dust". William E. Barton wrote in 1965 that without the success of "O Captain" and "Lilacs", "This Dust" and "Hush'd be the Camps" would have attracted little attention and added little to Whitman's reputation. The philosopher Martha Nussbaum considers the epitaph "one of Whitman's simplest and most eloquent statements". In 1965 Ramsey Clark, the United States attorney general, read part of the poem to a subcommittee of the United States House Committee on the Judiciary during a hearing on creating penalties for assassination of the president in the aftermath of the assassination of John F. Kennedy.

== See also ==
- Cultural depictions of Abraham Lincoln

== Sources ==
- Barton, William E. (1965) [1928]. Abraham Lincoln and Walt Whitman. Kennikat Press. OCLC 428681.
- Betts, William Wilson (1965). Lincoln and the Poets. University of Pittsburgh Press. OCLC 890544.
- Bradley, Sculley; Blodgett, Harold W.; Golden, Arthur; White, William (2008). "Preface". Leaves of Grass: A Textual Variorum of the Printed Poems, 1855–1856. NYU Press. pp. ix–xii. ISBN 978-0-8147-9442-5.
- Clark, Ramsey (1965). "Statements of Hon. Ramsey Clark". Providing Penalties for the Assassination of the President [or the Vice President]: Hearings Before Subcommittee No. 4, Eighty-ninth Congress, First Session, on H.R. 6097. May 26 and 27, 1965. U.S. Government Printing Office. p. 57.
- Coyle, William (1962). The Poet and the President: Whitman's Lincoln Poems. Odyssey Press. OCLC 2591078.
- Eiselein, Gregory (1998). "Lincoln's Death". In LeMaster, J. R.; Kummings, Donald D. (eds.). Walt Whitman: An Encyclopedia. Routledge. pp. 395–396. ISBN 978-0-8153-1876-7.
- Epstein, Daniel Mark (2004). Lincoln and Whitman: Parallel Lives in Civil War Washington (1st ed.). Ballantine Books. ISBN 978-0-345-45799-8. OCLC 52980509.
- Folsom, Ed (2019). "'The Foulest Crime': Whitman, Melville, and the Cultural Life of a Phrase". In Sten, Christopher; Hoffman, Tyler (eds.). 'This Mighty Convulsion': Whitman and Melville Write the Civil War. University of Iowa Press. pp. 23–32. ISBN 978-1-60938-664-1.
- Huffstetler, Edward W. (1998). "The American South". In LeMaster, J. R.; Kummings, Donald D. (eds.). Walt Whitman: An Encyclopedia. Routledge. pp. 671–672. ISBN 978-0-8153-1876-7.
- Loving, Jerome (1999). Walt Whitman: The Song of Himself. University of California Press. ISBN 0-520-21427-7. OCLC 39313629.
- Michael, John (2018). Secular Lyric: The Modernization of The Poem in Poe, Whitman, and Dickinson. Fordham University Press. ISBN 978-0-8232-7974-6. OCLC 1029634170.
- Nabers, Deak (2006). Victory of Law: The Fourteenth Amendment, The Civil War, and American literature, 1852-1867. Johns Hopkins University Press. ISBN 978-0-8018-8931-8. OCLC 213306078.
- Nussbaum, Martha C. (2011). "Democratic Desire: Walt Whitman". In Seery, John Evan (ed.). A Political Companion to Walt Whitman. University Press of Kentucky. pp. 96–130. ISBN 978-0-8131-2655-5. OCLC 707092896.
