= Cultural depictions of Abraham Lincoln =

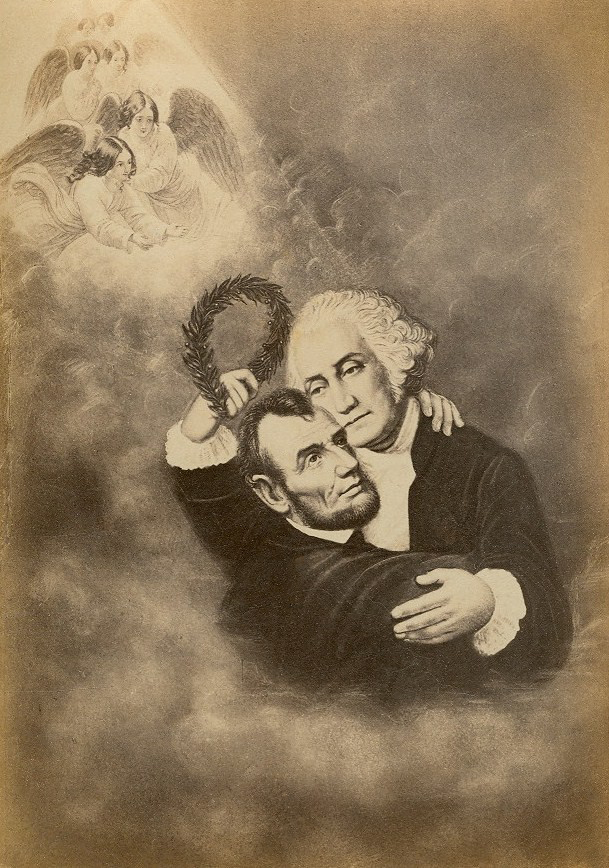
The Apotheosis of Abraham Lincoln, greeted by George Washington in heaven, who is holding a laurel wreath (an 1860s work, post-assassination)

Since his death in 1865, Abraham Lincoln has been an iconic American figure depicted, usually favorably or heroically, in many forms. Lincoln has often been portrayed by Hollywood, almost always in a flattering light. He has been depicted in a wide range of forms including alternative timelines, animation, documentary, small cameos, and fictionalized interpretations.

== Statues ==
Statues of Abraham Lincoln can be found in the United States and in other countries. In Ciudad Juárez, Chihuahua, Mexico, is a 13-foot (4 m) high bronze statue, a gift from the United States, dedicated in 1966 by President Lyndon B. Johnson. The U.S. received a statue of Benito Juárez in exchange, which is in Washington, D.C. Juárez and Lincoln exchanged friendly letters during the American Civil War. Mexico remembers Lincoln's opposition to the Mexican–American War. (For his part, Juárez refused to aid the Confederacy and jailed those Confederates who sought his help.) There is also a statue in Tijuana, Mexico, showing Lincoln standing and destroying the chains of slavery. There are at least three statues of Lincoln in the United Kingdom—one in Parliament Square in London by Augustus Saint-Gaudens, one in Manchester by George Grey Barnard and another in Edinburgh by George Bissell. There is also a bust of the President at St Andrews Church in Hingham, Norfolk, where Lincoln's ancestors lived. In Havana, Cuba, there is a bust of Abraham Lincoln in the Museum of the Revolution, a small statue of him in front of the Abraham Lincoln School, and a bust of him near the Capitolio. In Quito, Ecuador, a statue of Lincoln can be found in the Plaza Abraham Lincoln. Avenida Abraham Lincoln, in Santo Domingo, Dominican Republic is one of the capital city's most important and trafficked streets. In the Buenos Aires Province, Argentina, there is a city named Lincoln.

== Poetry ==
Shortly after Lincoln's death, hundreds of poems were written on the topic. The historian Stephen B. Oates noted that "never had the nation mourned so over a fallen leader" while the professor William Pannapacker argued "Perhaps no event in American history produced so great an outpouring of verse." Describing Lincoln as a martyr became a "popular sub-genre."

Walt Whitman was fascinated by Lincoln during the Civil War and wrote several poems about him after his death. Whitman's Lincoln poems are:

- "O Captain! My Captain!", 1865
- "When Lilacs Last in the Dooryard Bloom'd", 1865
- "Hush'd Be the Camps To-Day", 1865
- "This Dust Was Once the Man", 1871

Other poems on Lincoln include:

- "Let the Railsplitter Awake!", by Allen Ginsberg adapted from Pablo Neruda's "Que despierte el leñador"
- "Abraham Lincoln Walks at Midnight", Vachel Lindsay, 1914
- James Russell Lowell's "Commemoration Ode" (sixth stanza)
- Robert Lowell's "Abraham Lincoln"
- Herman Melville's "The Martyr", from Battle-Pieces and Aspects of the War

== Songs ==
Over 1000 pieces of music spanning every generation since his presidency have been written about Lincoln.

- Abraham, Martin and John, written by Dick Holler, recorded by Dion (1968). This popular song first appeared under a sheet music cover picturing Mount Rushmore.

== Classical music ==
- A Lincoln Portrait, by Aaron Copland, for narrator and orchestra. The subject is Lincoln's words. Contains excerpts from his 1862 annual address to Congress, the Lincoln-Douglas debates, and the Gettysburg Address. The narrator is usually a distinguished person the orchestra wishes to honor; among them have been Bill Clinton, Al Gore, and Barack Obama.
- Kurt Weill set "O Captain! My Captain!" to music in one of his Four Walt Whitman Songs.
- Paul Hindemith set "When Lilacs Last in the Dooryard Bloom'd" to music, as did Roger Sessions, Jennifer Higdon, in "Dooryard Bloom", and others.

== Film, drama, and fiction ==
Lincoln has been portrayed in many films and television shows since 1907.

=== 1846 ===
Lincoln himself wrote poetry and at least one piece of fiction loosely based upon one of the murder cases he defended as a young lawyer. In April 1846, The Quincy Whig published Lincoln's short story under the title "A Remarkable Case of Arrest for Murder". The story was republished in March 1952 by Ellery Queen's Mystery Magazine and retitled "The Trailor Murder Mystery." Lincoln refers to his own unnamed character as "the defense" and "the writer of this".

=== Late 1800s ===
- In Jules Verne's 1870 novel, Twenty Thousand Leagues Under the Seas, a fictitious steam frigate, the Abraham Lincoln, is sent to hunt down the "monster" that has been attacking ships at sea, and is attacked itself. Captain Nemo also has a portrait of Lincoln hanging in his study on board the Nautilus. In the sequel The Mysterious Island, the five shipwrecked Union prisoners name the island which they discover, "Lincoln Island".
- The German writer Karl May wrote two stories about Canada Bill Jones: Ein Self-man (1878) and Three carde monte (1879). The narrator meets several times with the young Abraham Lincoln and together they oppose "Kanada-Bill". Both stories have in common the first meeting of the heroes: The narrator finds Lincoln in a forest training to orate.
- In 1888, Edward Eggleston published The Graysons, a fictionalized account of a famous murder trial that Abraham Lincoln won in 1858 in central Illinois. The novel's action is moved to the 1830s, with Lincoln an up-and-coming young lawyer rather than a figure in national politics.

=== 1900–1909 ===
- The Clansman: A Historical Romance of the Ku Klux Klan (1905), a best-selling novel by Thomas Dixon Jr., which portrays Lincoln as sympathetic to the South. The book was adapted by D.W. Griffith into the 1915 film The Birth of a Nation. (Text of The Clansman.)
- The first motion picture based on Lincoln was 1908 film The Reprieve: An Episode in the Life of Abraham Lincoln. Directed by Van Dyke Brooke, the film shows Lincoln pardoning a sentry who fell asleep on duty, a theme that would be depicted repeatedly in other silent era shorts. This era is also when the first Abraham Lincoln impersonators originated, and the modern idea of what he sounded like is derived from these.

=== 1910–1919 ===
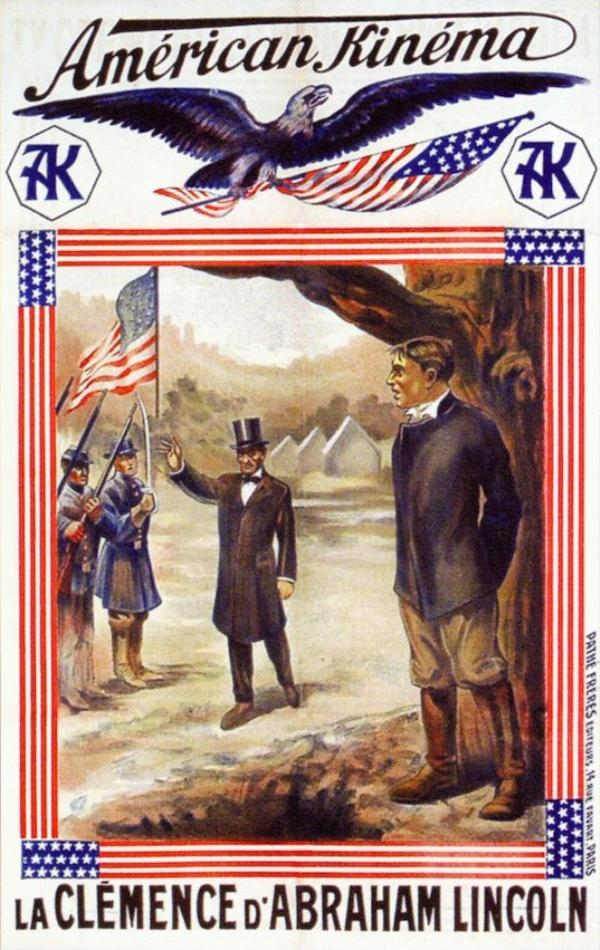
Abraham Lincoln's Clemency (1910)

- Abraham Lincoln's Clemency (1910), played by Leopold Wharton
- The Southerner: A Romance of the Real Lincoln (1913), novel by Thomas Dixon Jr.
- When Lincoln Paid (1913), played by Francis Ford
- The Battle of Gettysburg (1913), played by Willard Mack
- The Sleeping Sentinel (1914), played by George Steele
- The Birth of a Nation (1915), played by Joseph Henabery. Lincoln's assassination is the central event of the movie, dividing it into two halves (with an intermission).
- The Heart of Lincoln was a film made in 1915 and remade in 1922, with the latter version lost until 2024. "The 65-minute film was directed by Francis Ford, who also played Lincoln.... [E]xperts say it's a valuable artifact of film history".
- The Crisis (1916), played by Sam D. Drane
- Abraham Lincoln (1918), a John Drinkwater play

=== 1920–1929 ===
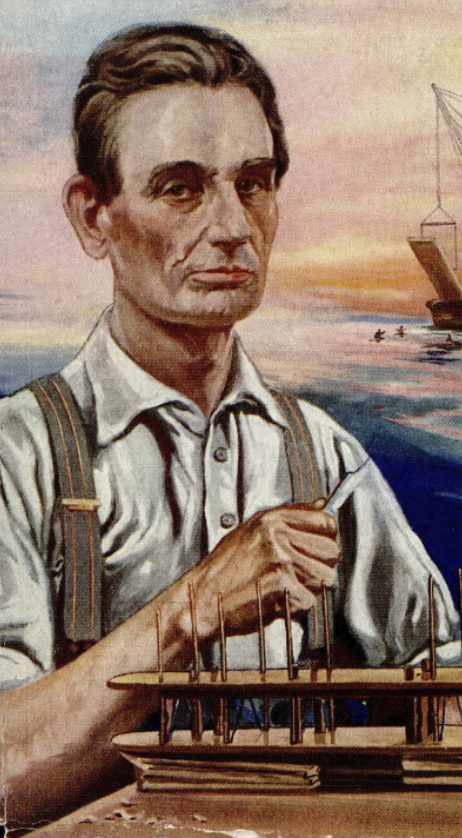
Lincoln depicted on the cover of the March 1924 issue of Popular Mechanics

- The Copperhead (1920), played by Nicholas Schroell
- In the Days of Buffalo Bill (1922), played by Joel Day
- The Dramatic Life of Abraham Lincoln (1924), played by George A. Billings
- Abaraham Lincoln (1924), played by Frank McGlynn Sr.; short film adaptation of the Drinkwater play
- The Iron Horse (1924), played by Charles Edward Bull
- Hands Up! (1926), played by George A. Billings

=== 1930–1939 ===
Abraham Lincoln (1930)

- Abraham Lincoln (1930), played by Walter Huston
- The Phantom President (1932), played by Charles Middleton
- The Littlest Rebel (1935), played by Frank McGlynn Sr.
- The Prisoner of Shark Island (1936), played again by Frank McGlynn Sr.
- Victoria the Great (1937), played by Percy Parsons
- Of Human Hearts (1938), played by John Carradine
- Abraham Lincoln (1938), played by Orson Welles; radio adaptation of the Drinkwater play, aired as the sixth episode of The Mercury Theatre on the Air
- American Years (1938), novel by Harold Sinclair. Lincoln makes a speech.
- Lincoln in the White House (1939), played again by Frank McGlynn Sr.
- Young Mr. Lincoln (1939), played by Henry Fonda

=== 1940–1949 ===
- Abe Lincoln in Illinois (1940), played by Raymond Massey based on the Pulitzer Prize winning play by Robert E Sherwood
- Virginia City (1940), played by Victor Kilian

=== 1950–1959 ===
- The Tall Target (1951), played by Leslie Kimmell
- Abraham Lincoln (1952), played by Robert Pastene with James Dean playing the court-martialed William Scott; CBS adaptation of the Drinkwater play
- Southern Fried Rabbit (1953), voiced by Mel Blanc (as Bugs Bunny) scolding Yosemite Sam (also voiced by Blanc) for "whipping slaves"
- Prince of Players (1955), played by Stanley Hall
- Black Friday, a 1955 episode of Medic, played by Austin Green
- The Stepmother, a 1956 episode of Telephone Time, played by Ronnie Lee
- The Story of Mankind (1957), played again by Austin Green

=== 1960–1969 ===
- The Passersby, a 1961 episode of The Twilight Zone, played again by Austin Green
- How the West Was Won (1962), played again by Raymond Massey
- Great Moments with Mr. Lincoln (1964 World's Fair 1965 Disneyland Park), which featured an audio-animatronic voiced by Royal Dano
- The Chase, a 1965 episode of Doctor Who, played by Robert Marsden
- Death Trap, a 1966 episode of The Time Tunnel, played by Ford Rainey
- The Savage Curtain, a 1969 episode of Star Trek: The Original Series, a clone of Lincoln made in the year 2269, played by Lee Bergere
- We Can Build You, a Philip K. Dick novel first serialised as 'A. Lincoln, Simulacrum' in 1969, & a direct prequel to Do Androids Dream Of Electric Sheep?

=== 1970–1979 ===
- The Hall of Presidents opens at Walt Disney World featuring all 36 presidents to date, including Lincoln (1971)
- George MacDonald Fraser's 1971 novel Flash for Freedom! features a young Abraham Lincoln at the time that he was a Congressman. Anti-hero narrator and self-confessed cad Harry Flashman describes him as having "the makings of as big a scoundrel as I am myself".
- In The Great Man's Whiskers (1972), Dennis Weaver portrays Lincoln.
- In Sandburg's Lincoln (1974–1976), Hal Holbrook plays the title character.
- In "Sex and Violence", a 1975 pilot for The Muppet Show, an Abraham Lincoln Muppet (performed by John Lovelady) appears as part of the Muppet version of Mount Rushmore.
- Guardian of the Wilderness (1976), played by Ford Rainey.
- The Adams Chronicles (1976), played by Stephen D. Newman.
- Lincoln is among the historical figures depicted in Our Nation's 200th Birthday, The Telephone's 100th Birthday by Stanley Meltzoff for Bell System.
- The Lincoln Conspiracy (1977), played by John Anderson.
- In the Belgian comic series Lucky Luke, Abraham Lincoln appears in a cameo as the president of the United States in the album "Le Fil qui chante" released in 1977 by Morris (artist) and Rene Goscinny (writer). He commissions the construction of the First Transcontinental Telegraph and Lucky Luke volunteers to help. Lincoln re-appears in the comic "Lucky Luke contre Pinkerton" released in 2010 by Achde (artist) and Daniel Pennac and Tonino Benacquista (writers), where he assigns Allan Pinkerton to be his personal guard.

=== 1980–1989 ===
- Lincoln impersonator Rex Hamilton was introduced in the opening credits of each episode of Police Squad! shooting back at John Wilkes Booth, though he would not further appear in any episodes.
- Gregory Peck portrayed Lincoln in the 1982 television movie, The Blue and the Gray.
- In the miniseries North and South, Hal Holbrook played Lincoln (once again) in Books I and II
- In the 1986 miniseries Dream West, Lincoln was played by F. Murray Abraham
- The 1987 American TV series Amerika displays an America occupied by Soviet troops. Lincoln's image is displayed along Marx's and Lenin's in parades, exemplifying the re-interpretation of American symbols by the new state.
- He appeared in the 1987 film The Garbage Pail Kids Movie inside the State Home of the Ugly for being "too skinny", along with Mohandas Gandhi for being "too bald" and Santa Claus for being "too fat."
- In the sketch comedy series SCTV, Joe Flaherty plays a time-traveler Lincoln going to the past to chase the child John Wilkes Booth through time with a gun to prevent his assassination, repeatedly failing attempts to kill Booth. Catherine O'Hara plays Mrs. Lincoln who asks her time traveler husband where her future is to lead her. When he casually responds "in an insane asylum", she proclaims her foresight ability, responding "I knew it!"
- Based on a novel by Gore Vidal, the 1988 telefilm Lincoln starred Sam Waterston in the title role, and Mary Tyler Moore as his wife.
- Robert V. Barron appeared as Lincoln in Bill & Ted's Excellent Adventure (1989), and in episodes of Out of This World (#2.15, 1988).
- Appears as Joshua Speed in Parke Godwin's sci-fi novel The Snake Oil Wars.
- Appears in a This Is America, Charlie Brown episode titled "The Smithsonian and the Presidency", with his segment focusing on the Gettysburg Address. He is voiced by Frank Welker.

=== 1990–1999 ===
- The Civil War (1990) Sam Waterston played Lincoln
- In the Red Dwarf episode "Meltdown", Lincoln (played by Jack Klaff) was featured as a Waxdroid in a theme park planet called Waxworld, where evil waxdroids and good waxdroids are fighting.
- In the first installment of Sid Meier's Civilization (1991), Lincoln is featured as the playable leader of the Americans.
- In Harry Turtledove's alternate history novel The Guns of the South (1992), several members of the South African white supremacist organisation Afrikaner Weerstandsbeweging travel back in time from 2014 to January 1864 and provide Confederate army general Robert E. Lee's Army of Northern Virginia with AK-47s, allowing the Confederate States of America to win the Second American Revolution. Lincoln signs an armistice at the White House, is defeated in his reelection campaign, and returns to his Illinois law office.
- In the alternate history short story The Lincoln Train by Maureen F. McHugh, Abraham Lincoln survives his assassination attempt by John Wilkes Booth, but is rendered a vegetable, and incapable of governing the nation. This leads to William H. Seward becoming acting president and instigating a harsh policy of Reconstruction.
- In the short story "Must and Shall" (1995) by Harry Turtledove, Lincoln is killed by enemy fire at the Battle of Fort Stevens in 1864, leading to Hannibal Hamlin becoming president and instituting a harsh Reconstruction after the war's end in 1865.
- In Sid Meier's Civilization II (1996), Lincoln appears as one of the two leaders of the Americans, the other being Eleanor Roosevelt.
- A&E Biography: "Abraham Lincoln - Preserving the Union" (1997)
- An Abraham Lincoln robot acts as a defense attorney for African-American children Leon, Kahlil, LaShawn and Pee-Wee in Bebe's Kids (1992).
- Lincoln appears in the Animaniacs episode "Four Score and Seven Migraines Ago" (1993), voiced by Peter Renaday. He is assisted in writing the Gettysburg Address by the Warners.
- Lincoln appeared as an occasional guest host on Histeria!, especially in two episodes centered on the Civil War. Pepper Mills mistakes him for Lurch from The Addams Family, and one sketch shows the Civil War politics like an episode of Seinfeld, with Lincoln as Jerry and George B. McClellan as George Costanza. In another sketch, Loud Kiddington demands he explain the parts of the Gettysburg Address that he does not understand (such as what "four score" means). On Histeria!, Abe acts like Johnny Carson and was voiced by Maurice LaMarche.
- In the 1993 film Coneheads, Dan Aykroyd's character dresses as Lincoln for a costume ball, as the President's stovepipe hat effectively covers his cone-shaped head.
- Tad (1995), played by Kris Kristofferson.
- The Speeches of Abraham Lincoln (1995)
- In an episode of the HBO sketch comedy series Mr. Show, Abraham Lincoln is portrayed (in an openly historically inaccurate skit) as the man who designed the American flag. Tom Kenny portrayed Lincoln as speaking in a thick New York accent.
- In Harry Turtledove's alternate history novel How Few Remain (1997), set in 1881–2, part of the Southern Victory Series, Lincoln is a viewpoint character. As a disgraced former president, he travels to the western territories on a speaking tour, and founds an American socialist movement.
- Talk show Late Night with Conan O'Brien started in 1993, with Dino Stamatopoulos as the original portrayer of Lincoln. In 1999, Mike Sweeney took over this role.
- In the DC Comics Elseworld title Superman: A Nation Divided, a reimagining of Superman's origins as coming into his powers during the American Civil War, President Lincoln features heavily. He is first seen reading field reports by General Ulysses S. Grant that describe "Atticus" Kent's special abilities. Lincoln then assumes Grant has been drinking until Kent himself shows up at the White House. After Kent helps win the war, he accompanies Lincoln to the Ford Theater where he prevents John Wilkes Booth's assassination attempt. After this, Lincoln is seen to be one of the most popular presidents in history, serving two full terms.
- In 1998, Scott McCloud wrote and drew the graphic novel The New Adventures of Abraham Lincoln, in which the president seemingly returns to life in the present day; however, it is in fact a disguised Benedict Arnold, working for aliens in a plot to conquer the world. He is unmasked by the true Lincoln, who also returns from the dead.
- In 1998, TNT aired The Day Lincoln Was Shot, with Lance Henriksen as Abraham Lincoln and Rob Morrow as John Wilkes Booth. The film is a remake of Ford Star Jubilee: The Day Lincoln Was Shot (1956).
- In 1998, Dann Florek played Lincoln in the short-lived comedy television series The Secret Diary of Desmond Pfeiffer
- In 1999, a comic book story featuring The Phantom was made called Lincoln's Murder, and published in Europe and Australia.
- In the MTV claymation television series Celebrity Deathmatch, he appears as a fighter facing off against George Washington.

=== 2000–2009 ===
- In the film Bedazzled (2000), Brendan Fraser's character makes a deal with the Devil (Elizabeth Hurley) for seven wishes. Upon wishing to be President of the United States, he is transformed into Lincoln and finds himself in Ford's Theatre watching "Our American Cousin" on the night of his assassination.
- Abraham and Mary Lincoln: A House Divided (2001), a documentary on PBS's American Experience.
- Clone High (2002) features a clone of Abraham Lincoln as a major character (voiced by Will Forte).
- In Sid Meier's Civilization III (2001), Lincoln appears once again as the playable leader of the Americans.
- In Gangs of New York (2002), Leonardo DiCaprio and Daniel Day-Lewis's characters attend a performance of the play Uncle Tom's Cabin in which an actor representing Lincoln is suspended in mid-air (with his body apparently backwards) to address the blackface actors. An audience member interrupts him, as the immigrant audience members begin throwing objects at Lincoln and rioting.
- In The Master of Disguise (2002), Pistachio Disguisey's grandfather tells him about the family legacy. In one part of the story, he tells about the Disguiseys helping Lincoln get elected.
- Lincoln appears as a main character in the 2002 comic book The Amazing Screw-On Head and its 2006 television pilot episode, being voiced by Corey Burton in the latter.
- Though The Grim Adventures of Billy & Mandy and Evil Con Carne are set in modern times, Lincoln (voiced by Peter Renaday) is strangely used to portray the President of the United States. One episode of The Grim Adventures of Billy & Mandy features him as Grim's replacement in Billy and Mandy's group of friends.
- In the 2004 alternative history mockumentary C.S.A.: The Confederate States of America, Abraham Lincoln flees after the South wins the war and annexes the northern states. Harriet Tubman attempts to help him flee to Canada in blackface makeup, but they are soon captured. He later declares, "Now I too am a Negro". Lincoln quickly tried for war crimes against the Confederacy and was imprisoned in Fortress Monroe, Virginia while Tubman is executed. In 1866, Lincoln—frail and gaunt from his two-year sentence—is fully pardoned by Confederate President Jefferson Davis and exiled to Canada. Lincoln remains until he dies in June 1905 at the age of 96. Shortly before his death, Lincoln laments not having made the Civil War a battle to end slavery.
- In Sid Meier's Civilization IV, Lincoln is added as one of the playable leaders of the Americans in the expansion pack Sid Meier's Civilization IV: Beyond the Sword (2007). In the base game, only George Washington and Franklin D. Roosevelt are playable leaders of America.
- In 2005, Lincoln appeared in the song and video of The Ultimate Showdown of Ultimate Destiny by Lemon Demon.
- In the 2006 American Dad! episode "Lincoln Lover", Stan Smith decides to write a one-man play to show his admiration for Lincoln and unwittingly ends up portraying him as a homosexual, attracting the attention of the Log Cabin Republicans.
- In an episode of The Venture Bros., the ghost of Lincoln requests the help of Hank and Dean to save the current president from being killed.
- National Treasure: Book of Secrets (2007) is a fictional film which concerns the assassination of Lincoln.
- In the fourth episode of the 2007 game Sam & Max Save the World, the statue of Lincoln at the Lincoln Memorial is converted into a giant robot. He returns in the game's final episode, and becomes a major recurring character in its sequels.
- Futurama featured different depictions of Abraham Lincoln:
  - An Evil Hologram of Lincoln appears in "Kif Gets Knocked Up a Notch", voiced by Maurice LaMarche.
  - A Robot Lincoln with 20 personalities (all of them Lincoln) called Abraham Lincolnbot appears in "Insane in the Mainframe", voiced by David Herman.
  - Abraham Lincoln's Head in a Jar has also appeared voiced by Billy West in the episodes "Put Your Head on My Shoulders" and "All the Presidents' Heads" and by Maurice LaMarche in Futurama: Into the Wild Green Yonder.
- He is ranked fourth in Electronic Gaming Monthly's list of the top ten video game politicians for his appearance in Fight Club for the PlayStation 2.
- In Robot Chicken's first Star Wars special, Lincoln (voiced by Hulk Hogan) is seen as being seated under the Lincoln Memorial, and engages in lightsaber combat with George W. Bush. In "Bionic Cow", Abraham Lincoln (voiced by Seth Green) is doing four score and seven kicks to Robert E. Lee's balls while two Union Soldiers hold Lee.
- Lincoln appears in the form of his statue at the Lincoln Memorial coming to life in the film Night at the Museum: Battle of the Smithsonian, voiced by Hank Azaria. In the video game adaption, Abraham Lincoln's statue is voiced by Jim Cummings.
- The Invincible comic book features Lincoln as an alter-ego of the superhero Immortal, who faked his death after his supposed assassination before reappearing in the modern day as a costumed crime-fighter.

=== 2010–2019 ===
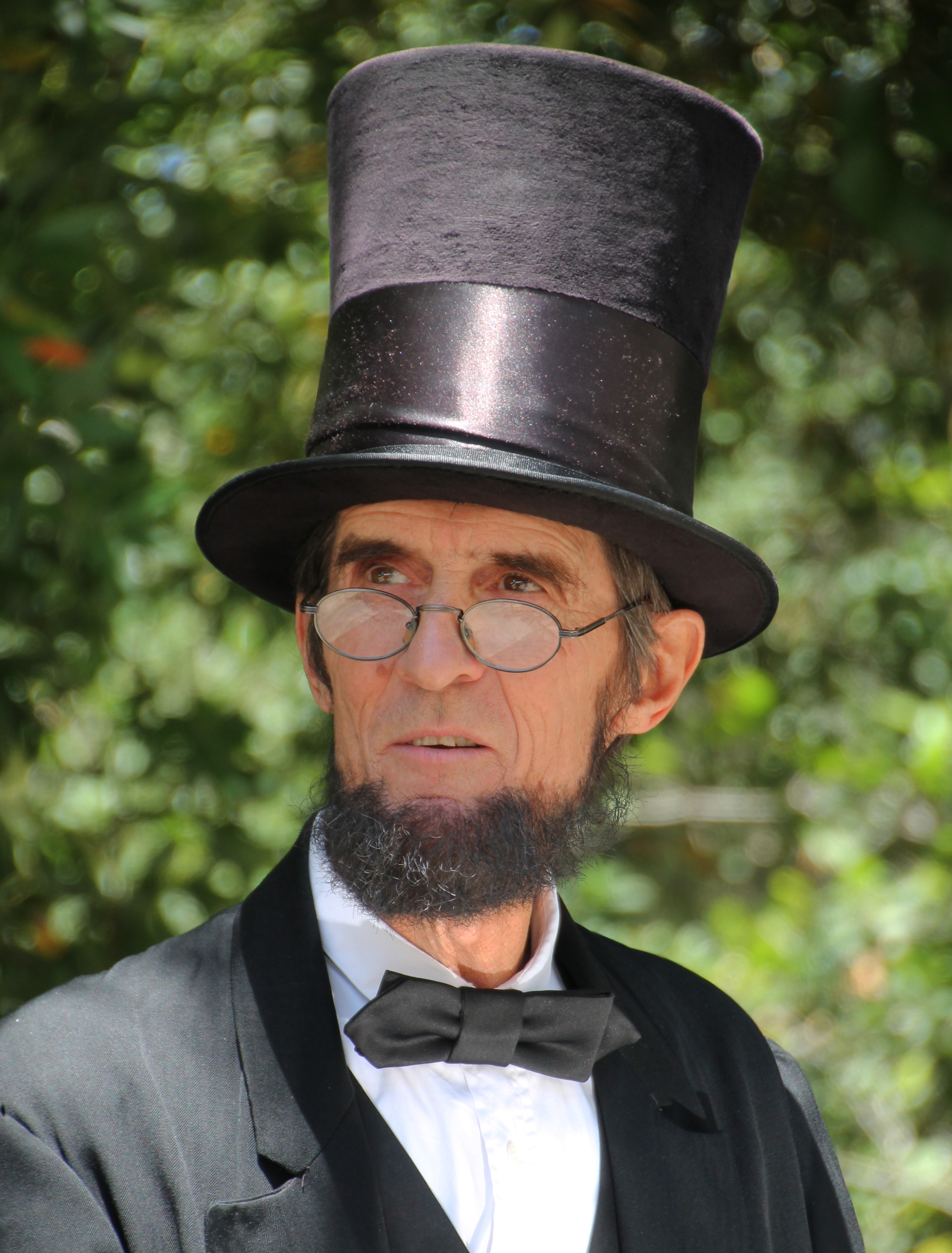
An Abraham Lincoln reenactor in 2015

- Abraham Lincoln, Vampire Hunter (2010) is a novel by Seth Grahame-Smith, in which Lincoln makes it his life's goal to destroy all evil vampires in the United States. The film adaptation was released in July 2012 with Benjamin Walker starring in the title role.
- Team Fortress 2 features a comic called Loose Canon that shows Abraham Lincoln as the original BLU team's pyro.
- The Conspirator (2010) deals with the aftermath of Lincoln's assassination, centering on Mary Surratt.
- In the 2011 director's cut of Gods and Generals based on the book of same name Lincoln was played by Christian Kauffman during a few added scenes, including one where Lincoln watches Macbeth featuring John Wilkes Booth where Booth gives the "Dagger of the Mind" soliloquy while staring intently at Lincoln.
- In the 2010-2019 TV show Adventure Time, Abraham Lincoln (voiced by Pendleton Ward) is depicted as the King of Mars in the 2007 short and in the main series episode "Sons of Mars". He is also mentioned in other episodes throughout the series.
- Abraham Lincoln appears in the cold opening of the Batman: The Brave and the Bold episode "Mitefall", voiced again by Peter Renaday. This version of Abraham Lincoln is from Parallel Universe 5501. While watching "Our American Cousin" with Mary, he is saved from John Wilkes Booth's assassination attempt by a Multiverse-hopping Batman who considers himself a longtime admirer of Abraham Lincoln. When John Wilkes Booth activated his steam-powered armor, Abraham Lincoln helped Batman to defeat John Wilkes Booth. Afterwards, Abraham Lincoln thanked Batman and states that reconstruction of their union can go on unabated. As Mary embraces Abraham Lincoln, Batman quotes "It was an honor to fight by your side President Lincoln." As Batman opens a portal to his next destination, he adds on to his comment "of Parallel Universe 5501" as he enters the portal.
- Lincoln, a 2012 film based on history depicted in Doris Kearns Goodwin's Team of Rivals: The Political Genius of Abraham Lincoln, directed by Steven Spielberg, with a screenplay by Tony Kushner, and starring Daniel Day-Lewis, who won the Academy Award for Best Actor for the role. The film focuses on Lincoln's determination to ensure that Congress passes the 13th Amendment, which abolished slavery.
- Louis C.K. parodied his show Louie as Lincoln on Saturday Night Live, portraying Lincoln as a stand-up comedian. (Season 38, Episode 6)
- Portrayed by Billy Campbell in Killing Lincoln.
- The film Abraham Lincoln vs. Zombies, from the Asylum, is a mockbuster of Abraham Lincoln: Vampire Hunter where Abraham Lincoln is portrayed by Bill Oberst Jr.
- The 2013 film Saving Lincoln depicts the friendship between Lincoln and his bodyguard Ward Hill Lamon.
- In The Lego Movie, Abraham Lincoln (voiced again by Will Forte) is one of the Master Builders. Abraham Lincoln's toy bio states that he lives in a log cabin that he built all by himself, in the middle of a forest that he built all by himself, then cut down, and then rebuilt all by himself again. Abraham Lincoln is among the Master Builders that meet in Cloud Cuckoo Land and to express his disdain towards Emmet where he commented "A house divided against itself... would be better than this!" Then he rode his white rocket chair that contains a large booster at the bottom of the chair, out of the "Dog" in Cloud Cuckoo Land much to the dismay of Emmet. He later joined in the battle against Lord Business and his forces in Bricksburg where his rocket chair carried Michelangelo Buonarroti and William Shakespeare. In the sequel, Lincoln was falling into the black hole during "Armageddon" as he says "I had theater tickets tonight!" as a reference to his assassination.
  - Abraham Lincoln is a playable character in The Lego Movie Videogame. He attacks by throwing the Gettysburg Address at enemies. He is also featured in the LEGO Movie 2 Video Game in 2019.
  - Abraham Lincoln also had a Collectable Minifigure Series containing him. The Lego figure itself comes with all parts exclusive to him except his legs. He has a top hat with a neck beard attached, suit and bow tie, black legs, and a piece of paper as an accessory containing his famous speech that says "four score and seven years ago" in cursive at the top of the accessory in reference to the Gettysburg Address. He was also made a minifigure after the release of The Lego Movie 2 Videogame in 2019, he wears a steampunk style top hat with goggles, an angry face expression, and a hatchet.
- Lincoln is featured in the novel The Great Abraham Lincoln Pocket Watch Conspiracy.
- Lincoln is featured as central character in the 2015 videogame Code Name: S.T.E.A.M., voiced by Wil Wheaton. This version of the character staged his own assassination, allowing him to disappear from the public eye and concentrate on running the S.T.E.A.M. strike force to combat the impending alien invasion.
- The 2015 novella The Well-Dressed Wound by Derek McCormack depicts Abraham and Mary Todd Lincoln conducting a séance to communicate with their dead son, Willie.
- Starting in 2016, author Jonathan F. Putnam has penned three historical mystery novels featuring Lincoln and his friend Joshua Fry Speed as the protagonists.
- Lincoln appears in the season 1 episode "The Assassination of Abraham Lincoln" of the NBC series Timeless, portrayed by Michael Krebs. In that episode, Abraham Lincoln was killed by time-traveler and former NSA asset Garcia Flynn despite Juliet Shakesman's attempt to warn him of an attempt on his life. She does, however, prevent Garcia in also taking out Ulysses S. Grant, who was also present.
- The Better Angels, aka, The Green Blade Rises, produced by Terrence Malick, focused on Lincoln's upbringing, showing the events and tragedies that forged him into the man he became.
- The Booker Prize-winning 2017 novel Lincoln in the Bardo by George Saunders depicts Lincoln mourning the death of his son, Willie.
- Lincoln is featured in the 2018 film documentary The Gettysburg Address, voiced by David Morse.

=== 2020–present ===
- Abraham Lincoln was portrayed by Carel Nel in Grant, a miniseries that aired on the History Channel from May 25, 2020, to May 27, 2020, and a depiction of Lincoln's top General Ulysses S. Grant, who later became president.
- Abraham Lincoln's ghost, voiced by Kelsey Grammer, appeared in The Ghost and Molly McGee.
- In the 2021 film America: The Motion Picture, voiced by Will Forte.
- In the 2022 History Channel miniseries Abraham Lincoln, Lincoln was portrayed by actor Graham Sibley.
- In November 2022, Lincoln was added to Civilization VI as a playable leader of the United States as part of the Leader Pass DLC. Previously, Theodore Roosevelt was the only American leader featured in the game.
- In the Apple TV+ miniseries Manhunt, Lincoln was portrayed by Hamish Linklater.
- In the children's book, My Day with Abe Lincoln, written by historian Jonathan W. White and illustrated by Madeline Renaux, a present-day girl travels back in time and attends school with the young Abe Lincoln and his sister, participating in actual events from Lincoln's childhood.
- In the comedic play Oh, Mary! (launched on Broadway on July 11, 2024), Abraham Lincoln was portrayed by Conrad Ricamora. In this alternate history, while Lincoln deals with the stress of being president following the Civil War, he also struggles with his homosexual urges.
- Lincoln appears as a fighter in the video game Electoral Carnage.
- Abraham Lincoln was portrayed by Kevin Fleming on the Toon In with Me episode "Trekkin' Series Finale: Land of Lincoln", where he is a special tour guide to Bill and Toony in Illinois.
- The Metropolitan Opera commissioned Missy Mazzoli and Royce Vavrek to adapt the 2017 novel Lincoln in the Bardo into an opera, which premiered in October 2026.
