= Charles Aldrich =

Charles Aldrich may refer to:

- Charles H. Aldrich (1850–1929), American politician who served as US Solicitor General
- Charles Aldrich (curator) (1828–1908), American journalist, bureaucrat, collector, and curator
- Charles Aldrich (Libertarian), American politician from Minnesota
- Charles Ronald Aldrich (1866–1939), American architect

== See also ==
- Charles Aldridge, New Zealand cricketer
