= Pioneers! O Pioneers! =

1865 poem by Walt Whitman

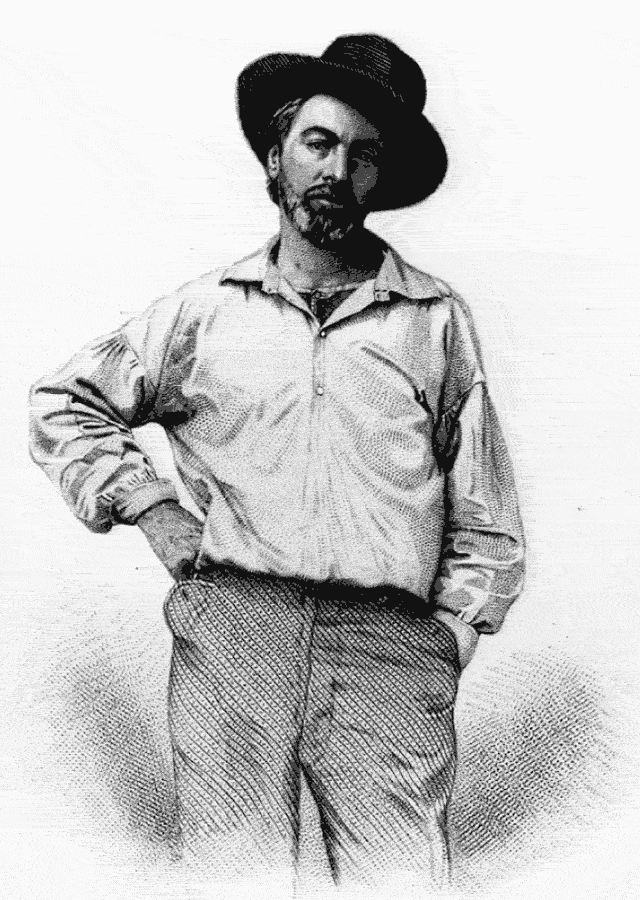
Walt Whitman, aged 37, steel engraving by Samuel Hollyer

"Pioneers! O Pioneers!" is a poem by American poet Walt Whitman. Published in Drum-Taps in 1865, the poem expresses Whitman's fervor for the Westward expansion occurring in the U.S. in the mid-19th century, as exemplified in the pioneers traveling the Oregon Trail, the miners of the California Gold Rush, and the workmen completing the first transcontinental railroad.

== The Poem ==
Come my tan-faced children,

Follow well in order, get your weapons ready,
Have you your pistols? have you your sharp-edged axes?
Pioneers! O pioneers!

For we cannot tarry here,
We must march my darlings, we must bear the brunt of danger,
We the youthful sinewy races, all the rest on us depend,
Pioneers! O pioneers!

O you youths, Western youths,
So impatient, full of action, full of manly pride and friendship,
Plain I see you Western youths, see you tramping with the foremost,
Pioneers! O pioneers!

Have the elder races halted?
Do they droop and end their lesson, wearied over there beyond the seas?
We take up the task eternal, and the burden and the lesson,
Pioneers! O pioneers!

All the past we leave behind,
We debouch upon a newer mightier world, varied world,
Fresh and strong the world we seize, world of labor and the march,
Pioneers! O pioneers!

We detachments steady throwing,
Down the edges, through the passes, up the mountains steep,
Conquering, holding, daring, venturing as we go the unknown ways,
Pioneers! O pioneers!

We primeval forests felling,
We the rivers stemming, vexing we and piercing deep the mines within,
We the surface broad surveying, we the virgin soil upheaving,
Pioneers! O pioneers!

Colorado men are we,
From the peaks gigantic, from the great sierras and the high plateaus,
From the mine and from the gully, from the hunting trail we come,
Pioneers! O pioneers!

From Nebraska, from Arkansas,
Central inland race are we, from Missouri, with the continental blood intervein'd,
All the hands of comrades clasping, all the Southern, all the Northern,
Pioneers! O pioneers!

O resistless restless race!
O beloved race in all! O my breast aches with tender love for all!
O I mourn and yet exult, I am rapt with love for all,
Pioneers! O pioneers!

Raise the mighty mother mistress,
Waving high the delicate mistress, over all the starry mistress, (bend your heads all,)
Raise the fang'd and warlike mistress, stern, impassive, weapon'd mistress,
Pioneers! O pioneers!

See my children, resolute children,
By those swarms upon our rear we must never yield or falter,
Ages back in ghostly millions frowning there behind us urging,
Pioneers! O pioneers!

On and on the compact ranks,
With accessions ever waiting, with the places of the dead quickly fill'd,
Through the battle, through defeat, moving yet and never stopping,
Pioneers! O pioneers!

O to die advancing on!
Are there some of us to droop and die? has the hour come?
Then upon the march we fittest die, soon and sure the gap is fill'd.
Pioneers! O pioneers!

All the pulses of the world,
Falling in they beat for us, with the Western movement beat,
Holding single or together, steady moving to the front, all for us,
Pioneers! O pioneers!

Life's involv'd and varied pageants,
All the forms and shows, all the workmen at their work,
All the seamen and the landsmen, all the masters with their slaves,
Pioneers! O pioneers!

All the hapless silent lovers,
All the prisoners in the prisons, all the righteous and the wicked,
All the joyous, all the sorrowing, all the living, all the dying,
Pioneers! O pioneers!

I too with my soul and body,
We, a curious trio, picking, wandering on our way,
Through these shores amid the shadows, with the apparitions pressing,
Pioneers! O pioneers!

Lo, the darting bowling orb!
Lo, the brother orbs around, all the clustering suns and planets,
All the dazzling days, all the mystic nights with dreams,
Pioneers! O pioneers!

These are of us, they are with us,
All for primal needed work, while the followers there in embryo wait behind,
We to-day's procession heading, we the route for travel clearing,
Pioneers! O pioneers!

O you daughters of the West!
O you young and elder daughters! O you mothers and you wives!
Never must you be divided, in our ranks you move united,
Pioneers! O pioneers!

Minstrels latent on the prairies!
(Shrouded bards of other lands, you may rest, you have done your work,)
Soon I hear you coming warbling, soon you rise and tramp amid us,
Pioneers! O pioneers!

Not for delectations sweet,
Not the cushion and the slipper, not the peaceful and the studious,
Not the riches safe and palling, not for us the tame enjoyment,
Pioneers! O pioneers!

Do the feasters gluttonous feast?
Do the corpulent sleepers sleep? have they lock'd and bolted doors?
Still be ours the diet hard, and the blanket on the ground,
Pioneers! O pioneers!

Has the night descended?
Was the road of late so toilsome? did we stop discouraged nodding on our way?
Yet a passing hour I yield you in your tracks to pause oblivious,
Pioneers! O pioneers!

Till with sound of trumpet,
Far, far off the daybreak call—hark! how loud and clear I hear it wind,
Swift! to the head of the army!--swift! spring to your places,
Pioneers! O pioneers!

== Analysis ==
The poem was written as an ode to Americans who set out in search of a more fulfilling life by settling the West. Whitman pays homage to the pioneers' courage as they risk danger. The poem's imagery, allegory, and rhythmic repetition of the "Pioneers! O Pioneers!" refrain convey enthusiasm for the pioneers and their sense of manifest destiny. The poem celebrates the adventurous spirit exhibited by "Western youths" of the poet's young country, and contrasts it with the "Elder races" in Europe who have wearied and halted in their pursuits. Whitman scholar Kirsten Harris says of the poem that "the myth of the west, so embedded in the development of the United States, functions as a continuum linking the past to the future; expansionism encompasses both tradition and potential."

Whitman employs various techniques to draw the reader into the poem. He uses the first person plural when describing the duties to be carried out by pioneers; this gives the poem an immediacy and a stronger emotional appeal. He repeats the words "our" and "we" to convey the notion that everyone is a pioneer, and to make the reader part of the poem: "O you daughters of the West! O you young and elder daughters! O you mothers and you wives! Never must you be divided, in our ranks you move united, Pioneers! O pioneers!" This passage illustrates how Whitman was not just targeting men; he was also persuading women to embark on the migration to the Far West. The poem was written during the frontier era, which did not draw to a close until the latter part of the 19th century, so the figure of the pioneer could be read both from a literal and symbolic standpoint. The poem refers back to the Revolutionary War through its description of youthful Americans challenging an older generation in order to chart a different future: "See my children, resolute children, By those swarms upon our rear we must never yield or falter, Ages back in ghostly millions frowning there behind us urging". Whitman calls out to would-be pioneers, telling them to venture where none have gone. By using the same allegorical metaphor to represent both manifest destiny and America as a country, the poet shows that his passion for exploration was not limited to what he could do himself.

Whitman paints a picture of what conditions are like for Western pioneers, for example, "Down the edges, through the passes, up the mountains steep" refers to forging new trails and crossing difficult terrain. By their toil and sacrifice, the pioneers enable others to follow in their footsteps. Whitman's imagery emphasizes how hard pioneering work is, and yet insists it is essential. The poet expresses pride in his youthful country, explains why pioneers must go forth, and appeals to all readers to honor pioneers. Because a pioneering spirit is often beneficial when confronting any new challenge, "Pioneers! O Pioneers!" continued to have relevance for later readers.

== Poetic structure ==
The poem consists of 26 four-line stanzas; each is made up of one short line, two longer lines, and another short line. Within each shorter line, there are two heavily accented syllables or syllable groups. In terms of units, the longer lines contain two units and the shorter lines one unit. The long lines have four accented syllables, and break in half with a caesura, usually marked with a comma. Each half of a long line mirrors the beginning and ending line by including two accented syllables.

== Similar pieces ==
Some of Whitman's most notable poems were written around the same mid-1860s period as "Pioneers! O Pioneers!" and exhibited similar qualities. "O Captain! My Captain!" featured a similar poetic structure, while "Song of the Broad Axe" also referenced America's westward expansion. The 1860s were a tumultuous time in the U.S., during and immediately after the Civil War, and "Pioneers! O Pioneers!" was one of Whitman's works that was a literary driving force to spur on the American people.

== Publication history ==
"Pioneers! O Pioneers!" was first published in Whitman's 1865 collection Drum-Taps, and was subsequently included in the 1867 U.S. edition of Leaves of Grass. Whitman made constant revisions to Leaves of Grass, and in doing so he transferred "Pioneers! O Pioneers!" to different sections within the various editions. In the 1867 edition, the poem had its own page and was not under a section heading. In the 1871-1872 edition, the poem was placed under the "Marches Now The War Is Over" section. In the 1881–1882 edition, the poem could be found under the "Birds of Passage" section.

== In popular culture ==
A portion of the poem read by actor Will Geer, along with an 1890 recording of Whitman reading his poem "America", were used in a series of Levi's ads directed by Cary Fukunaga and M. Blash. The ads were shown on TV and in movie theaters in U.S. and Canadian markets in late 2009.

During the 2013 NCAA Division I FBS football season, the Pac-12 Conference used selections of "Pioneers! O Pioneers!" in their commercial promoting the Pac-12 Network and the colleges in the Western United States.

The title of the 3rd season finale of SyFy's Defiance, "Upon The March We Fittest Die", was taken from the 14th stanza.

The poem is referenced in the title of Willa Cather's 1913 novel, O Pioneers!
