= Hush'd Be the Camps To-Day =

Poem by Walt Whitman about the assassination of Abraham Lincoln

- by Walt Whitman
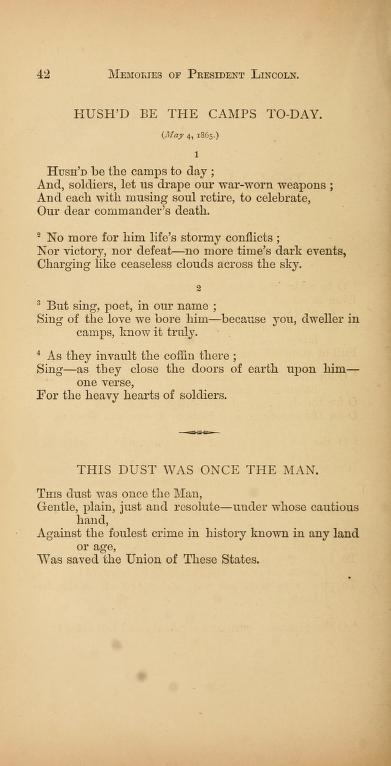
- Page 42 of the 1871 Leaves of Grass, part of the "Memories of President Lincoln" cluster, containing "This Dust Was Once the Man" and "Hush'd Be the Camps To-Day".
- Written: April 19, 1865
- First published in: The Poet and the President
- Language: English
- Subject: Death of Abraham Lincoln
- Publication date: May 4, 1865

"Hush'd Be the Camps To-Day" is a poem by Walt Whitman dedicated to Abraham Lincoln. The poem was written on April 19, 1865, shortly after Lincoln's assassination. Whitman greatly admired Lincoln and went on to write additional poetry about him: "O Captain! My Captain!", "When Lilacs Last in the Dooryard Bloom'd", and "This Dust Was Once the Man." "Hush'd" is not particularly well known, and is generally considered to have been hastily written. Some critics highlight the poem as Whitman's first attempt to respond to Lincoln's death and emphasize that it would have drawn comparatively little attention if Whitman had not written his other poems on Lincoln.

== Background ==
=== Walt Whitman and Abraham Lincoln ===
Although they never met, Whitman saw Abraham Lincoln several times between 1861 and 1865, sometimes in close quarters. The first time was when Lincoln stopped in New York City in 1861 on his way to Washington. Whitman noticed the President-elect's "striking appearance" and "unpretentious dignity", and trusted Lincoln's "supernatural tact" and "idiomatic Western genius". He admired the President, writing in October 1863, "I love the President personally." Whitman considered himself and Lincoln to be "afloat in the same stream" and "rooted in the same ground". Whitman and Lincoln shared similar views on slavery and the Union, and similarities have been noted in their literary styles and inspirations. Whitman later declared that "Lincoln gets almost nearer me than anybody else."

There is an account of Lincoln reading Whitman's Leaves of Grass poetry collection in his office, and another of the President saying "Well, he looks like a man!" upon seeing Whitman in Washington, D.C., but these accounts are probably fictitious. Lincoln's death on April 15, 1865, greatly moved Whitman, who wrote several poems in tribute to the fallen President. "O Captain! My Captain!", "When Lilacs Last in the Dooryard Bloom'd", "Hush'd Be the Camps To-Day", and "This Dust Was Once the Man" were all written as sequels to Drum-Taps. The poems do not specifically mention Lincoln, although they turn the assassination of the President into a sort of martyrdom.

== Text ==
HUSH'D be the camps to-day;
And, soldiers, let us drape our war-worn weapons;
And each, with musing soul retire, to celebrate,
Our dear commander's death.

No more for him life's stormy conflicts;
Nor victory, nor defeat—No more time's dark events,
Charging like ceaseless clouds across the sky.

But sing, poet, in our name;
Sing of the love we bore him—because you, dweller in
camps, know it truly.

Sing, to the lower'd coffin there;
Sing, with the shovel'd clods that fill the grave—a
verse,
For the heavy hearts of soldiers.

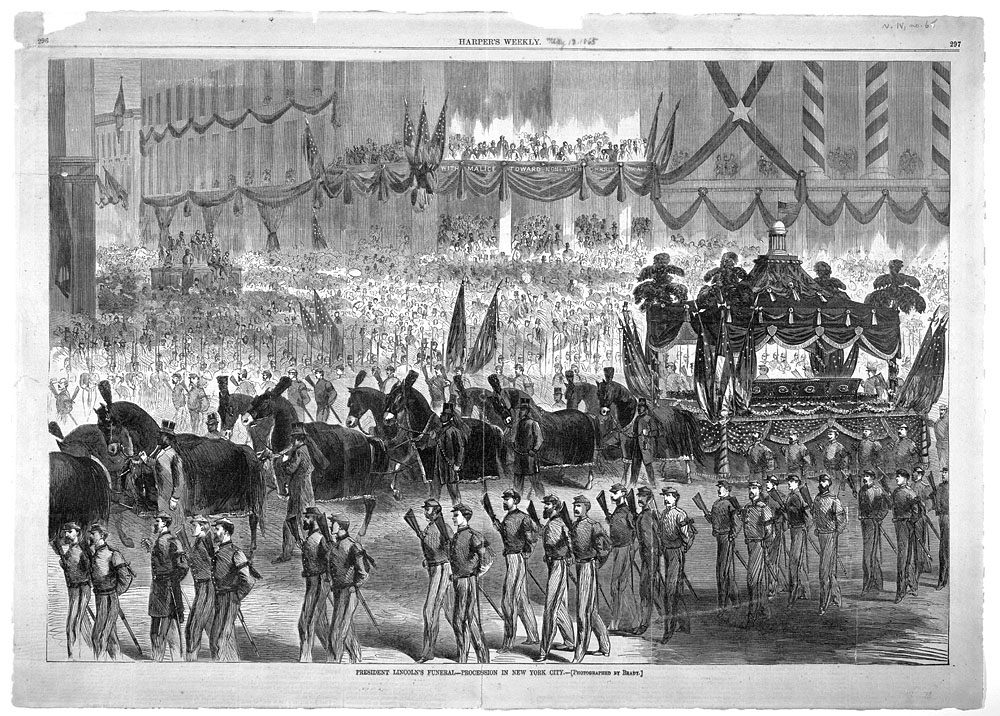
An image depicting Lincoln's funeral ceremonies in New York City

== Writing and publication ==
Whitman was home in Brooklyn on a break from his job with the Department of the Interior when he heard of Lincoln's assassination. He recalled that, although breakfast was served, the family did not eat and "not a word was spoken all day". He heard a similar story that troops under William Tecumseh Sherman on their homeward march were loud and jubilant until they heard the news about Lincoln, which stunned them into silence.

Although the poem is narrated from the point of view of a witness of Lincoln lying in state, Whitman himself likely didn't see it personally. The original subtitle of the poem included "April 19", the date Lincoln's coffin was on display in the East Wing of the White House, but Whitman did not leave Brooklyn for Washington, D. C. until April 24. He therefore also missed the ceremonies in New York when Lincoln's body was there on April 24.

The first poem that Whitman wrote on Lincoln's assassination was "Hush'd Be the Camps To-Day", which was dated April 19, 1865—the day of Lincoln's funeral in Washington. (Note: Whitman thought that Lincoln would be buried in Washington on April 19, writing "the shovel'd clods that fill the grave" in "Hush'd Be The Camps To-Day". Lincoln lay in state in Washington and his funeral train departed the city.) Although Drum-Taps had already begun the process of being published on April 1, Whitman felt it would be incomplete without a poem on Lincoln's death and hastily added "Hush'd Be the Camps To-Day". William Coyle, in his book The Poet and the President, gives a formal publication date of May 4, 1865, for the poem. It was later republished in the 1871 edition of Leaves of Grass in the "Memories of President Lincoln" cluster. Several commas were removed and the fourth stanza was revised.

== Reception and analysis ==
This short poem values collectivity—in the voice it adopts, in the rituals it devises. It not only values—more than all pomp-filled state memorials—the love borne by the common soldiers, but it also views poetry as merely one ingredient in an indigenous ritual, devised by the people for the people.

— Helen Vendler

Although the poem is not particularly well known, it was Whitman's first response to Lincoln's death, and the scholar Gregory Eiselein considers it to have many of the defining characteristics of Whitman's elegies to the fallen president. Eiselein particularly notes how the poem "mourns for the dead but celebrates death", considers Lincoln's death as a moment that will bring peace, and remembers Lincoln "not because he was a great leader or conqueror but because he was well-loved". By not naming Lincoln and comparing him to every soldier who died in the war, Whitman extends the elegy to all soldiers. The critic Helen Vendler considers "Hush'd" to be written from the collective voice of the Union Army mourning their commander. She argues that it demonstrates "omnimobility" of words by travelling from the camps to Lincoln's burial site.

The scholar Gay Wilson Allen considered "Hush'd" to be written "hastily" as Whitman's tribute to Lincoln's funeral. Whitman's biographer Justin Kaplan called "Hush'd" a "stop press insertion". Peter J. Bellis agreed, writing that "Hush'd Be the Camps To-Day", as Whitman's first elegy to Lincoln, "seeks both to describe and to perform that burial, to make itself the physical and narrative endpoint of the nation’s grief". "Hush'd Be The Camps To-Day" has inaccuracies and what scholar Ted Genoways describes as "stock form"; Whitman was unsatisfied by it. Allen argues that this poem was not "the elegy he [Whitman] felt was needed", and neither was "My Captain!" Throughout the summer Whitman developed his feelings on the assassination as he wrote "Lilacs", which represented the fitting elegy and was one of Whitman's greatest expressive works. Vendler noted that "Hush'd" is an instance of Whitman subordinating himself and writing as someone else.

In 1943, Henry Seidel Canby wrote that Whitman's poems on Lincoln have become known as "the poems of Lincoln". William E. Barton wrote in 1928 that neither "This Dust Was Once the Man" nor "Hush'd be the Camps" "would have attracted much attention at the time or have added anything later to the poet's reputation".

== See also ==
- Abraham Lincoln cultural depictions

== Bibliography ==
- Allen, Gay Wilson (1997). A Reader's Guide to Walt Whitman. Syracuse, New York: Syracuse University Press. ISBN 978-0-8156-0488-4.
- Barton, William E. (1965) [1928]. Abraham Lincoln and Walt Whitman. Port Washington, New York: Kennikat Press. OCLC 234090069.
- Bellis, Peter J. (2019). "Reconciliation as Sequel and Supplement". In Sten, Christopher; Hoffman, Tyler (eds.). "This mighty convulsion": Whitman and Melville write the Civil War. Iowa City. pp. 69–82. ISBN 978-1-60938-664-1. OCLC 1089839323.
- Coyle, William (1962). The Poet and the President: Whitman's Lincoln Poems. New York City: Odyssey Press. OCLC 2591078.
- Genoways, Ted (2006). "Civil War Poems in "Drum-Taps" and "Memories of President Lincoln"". In Kummings, Donald D. (ed.). A Companion to Walt Whitman. Hoboken, New Jersey: John Wiley & Sons. pp. 522–537. ISBN 978-1-4051-2093-7.
- Kaplan, Justin (1980). Walt Whitman, A Life (1st ed.). New York City: Simon & Schuster. ISBN 0-06-053511-3. OCLC 51984882.
- Loving, Jerome (1999). Walt Whitman: The Song of Himself. University of California Press. ISBN 0-520-21427-7. OCLC 39313629.
- Reynolds, David S. (1995). Walt Whitman's America: A Cultural Biography. New York City: Vintage Books. ISBN 9780195170092.
- Vendler, Helen (1988). The Music of what Happens: Poems, Poets, Critics. Harvard University Press. ISBN 978-0-674-59152-3.
