= Come Up from the Fields Father =

1865 poem by Walt Whitman

"Come Up from the Fields Father" is a poem by Walt Whitman. It was first published in the 1865 poetry volume Drum-Taps. The poem centers around a family living on a farm in Ohio who receives a letter informing them that their son has been killed, and chronicles their grief, particularly that of the boy's mother. It was one of his most frequently anthologized poems during his lifetime, and resonated with many Americans who had experienced the death of family members in the Civil War.

"Come Up from the Fields Father" continued to appear in anthologies after Whitman's death—though it has not received much critical attention. Scholars who have analyzed it have noted the sharp contrast between the letter the family expected to open and the one they got informing them of their son's death, the harshness of war imposing on the tranquility of an Ohio farm, and the absence felt throughout the poem, from the family's son to his father, who, despite being the subject of the poem is not its focus.

== Content ==
The poem tells the story of a family living in rural Ohio during the American Civil War. A mother and father have four children; their eldest, a son named Pete, has been sent to fight in the war, and their three daughters are still living with them. In the poem, the family gets a letter from Pete. Their eldest daughter calls for her father to "come up from the fields" and her mother to "come to the front door" to read the letter. A third-person narrator soon takes over the poem from the daughter and chronicles the family's grief as they learn that their son has died.

After the first stanza, where the eldest daughter exhorts her parents to come together, the second stanza establishes the scene—one the professor Kenneth M. Price deemed a "tranquil scene of pastoral harmony":

Lo, 'tis autumn;
Lo, where the trees, deeper green, yellower and redder,
Cool and sweeten Ohio's villages, with leaves fluttering
in the moderate wind;

After the scene has been set, the narrator interjects and reprises the daughter's call:

Down in the fields all prospers well;
But now from the fields come, father— come at the
daughter's call;
And come to the entry, mother—to the front door come,
right away.

The letter they have received reports that their son is "At present low, but will soon be better". However, Pete's mother is grief-stricken and "catches the main words only, / Sentences broke," and notes that the letter is not written in her son's handwriting, but it was signed with his name. Her daughter urges that she "Grieve not so,...the letter says Pete will soon be better," but the narrator interjects that "While they stand at home at the door he is dead already". At the end of the poem, the mother is yearning "silent from life [to] escape and withdraw, / To follow, to seek, to be with her dear dead son".

== Publication ==
Whitman likely wrote this poem after the death of Oscar Cunningham, a soldier from Ohio who Whitman, while working in a hospital during the Civil War, had cared for. Whitman had advised Cunningham's sister that she did not need to visit him, incorrectly thinking Cunningham would survive his injuries, a choice that meant she did not see him before his death. Whitman had also been on the receiving end of similar news, when his brother, George, also a soldier in the Civil War, was injured.

The poem first appeared in Drum-Taps, Whitman's 1865 volume of Civil War-era poetry. Whitman did not substantially revise the poem in subsequent publications. "Beat! Beat! Drums!" appears immediately before "Come Up from the Fields Father" in Drum-Taps. Scholar Julianne Ramsey describes "Beat! Beat! Drums" as a poem of "vigorous public militarism", which stands in sharp contrast to the "intimate family tragedy" of "Come Up from the Fields Father".

== Reception ==
The poem was generally well received and has been frequently anthologized. Its entry in Walt Whitman: An Encyclopedia described it as "a favorite of editors". The poem was one of Whitman's most popular during his lifetime, particularly during the Reconstruction era. The scholar Ed Folsom notes that it was his most anthologized poem in those years. Folsom felt that the poem found its success because of the vast populations that could relate to the loss of a family member during the war.

The poet Gerard Manley Hopkins wrote that "I always knew in my heart Walt Whitman's mind to be more like my own than any other man's living," after reading three Whitman poems, one of which was "Come Up from the Fields". The poem's structure has been cited as an influence in the development of Hopkins as a poet. "Come Up from the Fields" was one of thirty-four Whitman poems translated into Serbo-Croatian by Ivan V. Lalić in 1985.

=== Analysis ===
The scholar Helen Vendler wrote in 2009 that the poem had barely received any critical attention "because it seems such a naive poem." She noted that some had previously considered that the poem represented Whitman recording an actual event.

The letter which the family gets stands in sharp contrast to that which they would have wanted, a letter actually written by their son. According to the scholar Vanessa Steinroetter, as the family reads the letter, the focus of "Come Up" shifts from the whole countryside around the farm to simply the letter. It leaves the mother grieving and no resolution in sight. Steinroetter wrote that the mother's unresolved grief separates the poem from contemporary ones with similar themes, because many of them ended with religious sentiments or the grieving returning to work or patriotic support as a way of resolution. English professor Timothy Sweet similarly notes how the mother does not move on from her son's death. Despite the—at the time widely held—traditional Christian belief that that death could lead to a sort of "ritual reunification", here it causes "only disunity at even the most local level." Steinroetter writes that Whitman's description of "flashes" of black ink from the letter swimming before the mother's eyes ties her emotional pain to her son's physical injury.

This letter disrupts the "pastoral" farm scene that the family had been living in; Sweet highlighted how the poem emphasizes the Civil War's impact on the lives of ordinary Americans, as the family realize that their son had become "an innocent scapegoat." The Cambridge Companion to Walt Whitman notes the juxtaposition of two narrators throughout the poem, the family learning of the death of their son and an unknown sympathetic onlooker.

Although the poem is titled after words directed to a father, its body focuses on the grief of a mother; indeed the father does not appear at all after being called. Price felt that one of the major aspects of the poem was absence, not only that of the father, but also of the son and smell of the farm. Additionally, the letter they receive was written by a "strange hand" and understates the severity of the news it delivers, saying, for instance, "At present low, but will soon be better". Price notes that when Whitman, as a nurse, had written similar letters to families, he could not see their reaction while in the poem the person who is unseen is the soldier and those writing the letter. Whitman's choice to name the soldier 'Pete' could be in reference to the beginning of Whitman's relationship with Peter Doyle, which happened around the same time. It was uncommon for Whitman to name characters he wrote about, and Price theorizes the name reflects "the intensity of [Whitman's] emotions".

== Bibliography ==
- Allen, Gay Wilson; Folsom, Ed (1995). Walt Whitman and the World. University of Iowa Press. ISBN 978-1-58729-004-6.
- Hoffman, Tyler; Sten, Christopher (2019). "Materiality in the Civil War Poetry of Melville and Whitman". This Mighty Convulsion: Whitman and Melville Write the Civil War. University of Iowa Press – via Muse.
- Greenspan, Ezra (1995-06-30). The Cambridge Companion to Walt Whitman. Cambridge University Press. ISBN 978-1-139-82516-0.
- Price, Kenneth M. (2020). Whitman in Washington: Becoming the National Poet in the Federal City. Oxford University Press. ISBN 978-0-19-884093-0.
- Rowe, John Carlos (1997). At Emerson's Tomb: The Politics of Classic American Literature. Columbia University Press. ISBN 978-0-231-05894-0.
- Sweet, Timothy (1990). Traces of War: Poetry, Photography, and the Crisis of the Union. Johns Hopkins University Press. ISBN 0-8018-3959-9.
- Vendler, Helen (2009-06-30). Poets Thinking. Harvard University Press. ISBN 978-0-674-04462-3.
- Whitman, Walt (2021). ""Come Up from the Fields Father" (from Drum-Taps)". In Folsom, Ed (ed.). "The Million Dead, Too, Summ'd Up": Walt Whitman's Civil War Writings. University of Iowa Press. doi:10.2307/j.ctv1fx4hcd. ISBN 978-1-60938-746-4. JSTOR j.ctv1fx4hcd. S2CID 233807064.
