= James O'Donnell Bennett =

American journalist (1870–1940)

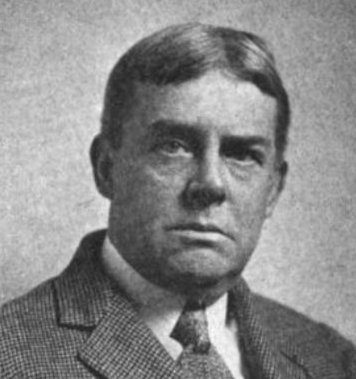
- Born: May 1, 1870; Jackson, Michigan
- Died: February 27, 1940 (aged 69); Chicago, Illinois
- Occupation: Writer

James O'Donnell Bennett (1870–1940) was an American journalist and author. He was best known for writing for the Chicago Tribune and the Chicago Record-Herald, and sometimes used the pseudonym "Eye Witness".

== Biography ==
James O'Donnell Bennett was born in Jackson, Michigan on May 1, 1870. He attended the University of Michigan, but left after two and a half years.

He died from a coronary thrombosis in Chicago on February 27, 1940, and was buried at Mount Evergreen Cemetery in Jackson.
