= Sequel to Drum-Taps =

Book by Walt Whitman

Sequel to Drum-Taps: When Lilacs Last in the Dooryard Bloom'd and other poems
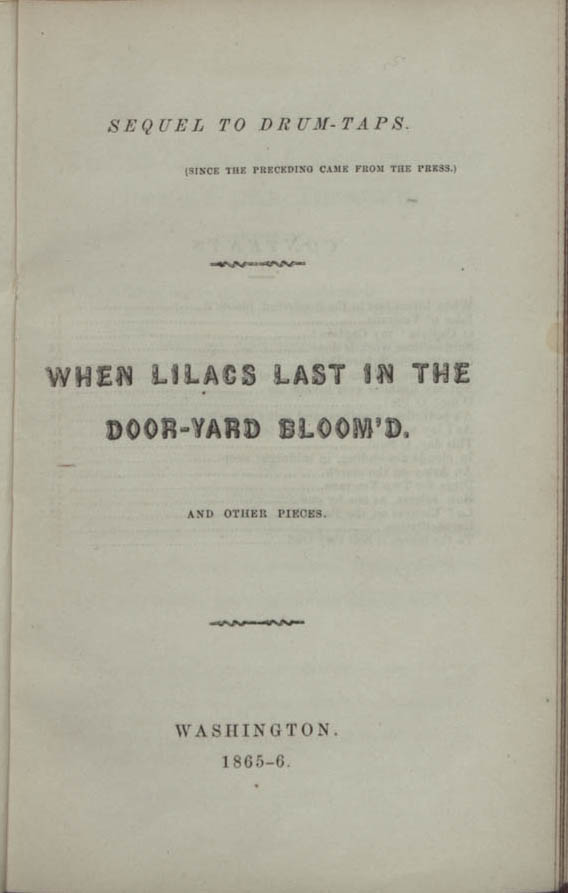
- Title page of the first printing of Sequel to Drum-Taps
- Author: Walt Whitman
- Published: 1865
- Preceded by: Drum-Taps

Sequel to Drum-Taps: When Lilacs Last in the Dooryard Bloom'd and other poems is a collection of eighteen poems written and published by American poet Walt Whitman in 1865.

Most of the poems in the collection reflect on the American Civil War (1861–1865), including the elegies "When Lilacs Last in the Dooryard Bloom'd" and "O Captain! My Captain!", which were written in response to the 1865 assassination of Abraham Lincoln. The poems of this book were later included in Leaves of Grass, Whitman's comprehensive collection of his poetry that was frequently expanded throughout his life.

== Background ==
At the start of the American Civil War (1861–1865), Whitman moved from New York City to Washington, D.C. where he obtained work in a series of government offices, at first with the Army Paymaster's Office and later with the Bureau of Indian Affairs. He volunteered as a nurse in the army hospitals. His experience as a nurse informed his poetry, which matured into reflections on death and youth, the brutality of war, and patriotism; and offered stark images and vignettes of the war.

Many of his Civil War poems were assembled into a collection that Whitman titled Drum-Taps. After the publication and printing of Drum-Taps in Brooklyn in April 1865, Whitman intended to supplement the collection with several additional Civil War poems and a handful of new poems mourning the assassination of President Abraham Lincoln that he had written between April and June 1865.

After returning to Washington, D.C., in summer 1865, Whitman contracted with Gibson Brothers to publish a pamphlet of eighteen poems—which he intended to include with copies of Drum-Taps—that would have two works directly addressing the assassination: the elegies "When Lilacs Last in the Dooryard Bloom'd" and "O Captain! My Captain!". The 24-page collection was titled Sequel to Drum-Taps and bore the subtitle When Lilacs Last in the Door-Yard Bloom'd and other poems; the titular poem, "When Lilacs Last in the Dooryard Bloom'd", filled the first nine pages. In October, after the pamphlet was printed, Whitman travelled to Brooklyn to collate and bind them into copies of Drum-Taps. He added the poems from Drum-Taps and Sequel to Drum-Taps as a supplement to the fourth edition of Leaves of Grass, printed in 1867 by William E. Chapin.

== Poems ==
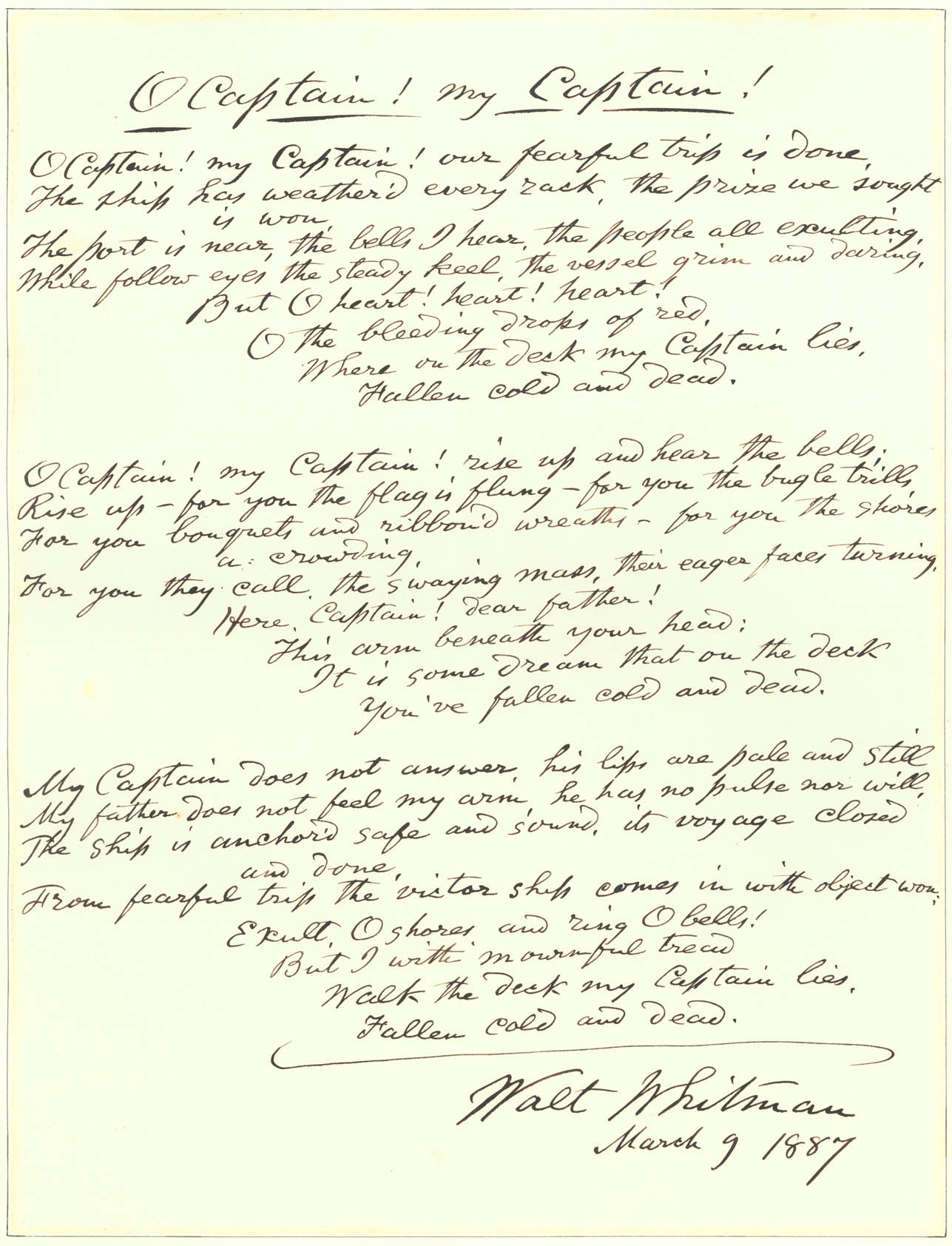
A handwritten draft, dated 9 March 1887, of Whitman's 1865 poem "O Captain! My Captain!"

The collection consisted of 18 poems, in the following order:

- "When Lilacs Last in the Dooryard Bloom'd"
- "Race of Veterans"
- "O Captain! My Captain!"
- "Spirit whose work is done"
- "Chanting the Square Deific"
- "I heard you, solemn sweet pipes of the Organ"
- "Not my Enemies ever invade me"
- "O me! O life!"
- "Ah poverties, wincings, and sulky retreats"
- "As I lay with my head in your lap, Camerado"
- "This day, O Soul"
- "In clouds descending, in midnight sleep"
- "An Army on the march"
- "Dirge for Two Veterans"
- "How solemn, as one by one"
- "Lo! Victress on the Peaks!"
- "Reconciliation"
- "To the leaven'd Soil they trod"
