= Stanley Meltzoff =

American painter

- Born: 27 March 1917; New York City, New York, United States
- Died: 9 November 2006 (aged 89); Red Bank, New Jersey, United States
- Education: New York University (MA)
- Spouse(s): Alice (died 1979) Diane Pogrant (m. 1999)
- Children: Sarah and Annie
- Parent(s): Nathan Meltzoff; Sadie

Stanley Meltzoff (March 27, 1917 - November 9, 2006) was an American painter most known for his marine paintings.

== Early life and career ==
Born in New York City to Nathan Meltzoff, a cantor at a Manhattan synagogue, Stanley Meltzoff graduated from the City College of New York and became an instructor at Pratt Institute. Living in Italy during World War 2, he was an artist and journalist for the U.S. military magazine Stars and Stripes. He also created visuals for Puptent Poets, a paperback of soldiers' verse.

Returning to New York City after the war, he spent years alternating between teaching and art before becoming a full-time illustrator in 1949.

== Later career ==
During the 1950s, Meltzoff created dozens of paperback covers for novels by Robert Heinlein and others, and did artwork for Madison Avenue advertising agencies. He painted covers and interior spreads for magazines including Life, National Geographic, The Saturday Evening Post, and The Atlantic, providing covers to Scientific American.

With the advent of low-cost color photography and reproduction in the early 1960s, Meltzoff began painting saltwater game fish in their undersea environments. His marine-life art ran in such magazines as Sports Illustrated, Field and Stream, Gray's Sporting Journal, Outdoor Life, Sporting Classics, Sports Afield, and Wildlife Art.

Perhaps his most famous artwork is the cover for the 1976 Bell System directory, commemorating both the United States Bicentennial and the centennial of the invention of the telephone. Based on Norman Rockwell's The Gossips, Meltzoff depicts America's great historical and iconic figures using the telephone. It became the biggest selling directory in the company's history.

== Recognition ==
Meltzoff's art hangs in The National Gallery and the Getty Museum.

== Personal life ==
Meltzoff was a member of the Society of Animal Artists.

Meltzoff died in 2006 at age 89.
