= Drum-Taps =

Book by Walt Whitman

- Cover to Drum-Taps
- Author: Walt Whitman
- Language: English
- Subject: American Civil War
- Genre: Poetry
- Publisher: Peter Eckler
- Publication date: May 1865
- Publication place: United States
- Media type: Book
- Pages: 72
- Preceded by: Leaves of Grass
- Followed by: Sequel to Drum-Taps

Drum-Taps is a collection of poetry composed by American poet Walt Whitman during the American Civil War. It was published in May 1865. The first 500 copies of the collection were printed in early April 1865, the month President Abraham Lincoln was assassinated. Whitman biographer David S. Reynolds wrote that it is "the finest Civil War poetry we have". Eighteen poems were added later in 1865 to create Sequel to Drum-Taps, which includes "O Captain! My Captain!" and "When Lilacs Last in the Dooryard Bloom'd", elegies to President Lincoln. "Whitman eventually integrated Drum-Taps into Leaves of Grass. In 1867 Drum-Taps and the Sequel appeared as appendices to Leaves of Grass. In 1871 Whitman began to incorporate the poems into Leaves of Grass proper: he placed many of them in a cluster titled 'Drum-Taps' and distributed others throughout Leaves of Grass."

== History ==
=== Creating the publication ===
Whitman's poetry during this time was significantly affected by the American Civil war. Little is known about when many of the poems in Drum-Taps were actually written.

In the winter of 1862, Whitman traveled to Virginia in search of his brother, George, who he heard had been wounded in the Battle of Fredericksburg. Whitman was profoundly moved by the vast number of casualties of war he saw. For the next three years, he would devote himself to helping wounded soldiers. Many considered him a nurse and he acted as one, dutifully dressing wounds, assisting in amputations and administering medications. Whitman, however, insisted he be referred to as something simpler, calling himself a mere "visitor & consolatory," one who brought "soothing invigoration" to the sick and wounded. His time in the hospitals would have a major effect on his poetry, with some of the poems in Drum-Taps being directly based on events that transpired in these places. Whitman found great richness to being in the military camps. He was fascinated by the men and wrote letters for them. His experiences here would fill his notebook as rough-draft poems that constitute his 1865 publication. Years later, Whitman told Horace Traubel that Drum-Taps was "put together by fits and starts, on the field, in the hospitals as I worked with the soldier boys."

=== Publishing process ===
By June 23, 1864, Whitman was on the verge of a mental breakdown and grew so ill from his hospital work that he was forced to retire to his home in Brooklyn. On July 24, he declared himself "gradually alleviated, until now I go about pretty much the same as usual", and he dedicated himself to publishing. "I intend to move heaven & earth to publish my Drum-Taps as soon as I am able to go around", Whitman told his friend and associate William O'Connor.

Whitman feared that his previous works had been so controversial that he had scared off legitimate publishers from publishing his poetry. Whitman explained to O'Connor, "I shall probably try to bring it out myself, stereotype it, & print an edition of 500 — I could sell that number by my own exertions in Brooklyn and New York in three weeks." O'Connor was concerned that a privately published book would not be widely available. He hoped that this book would cement Whitman's fame, but he was going to have to wait for this.

Whitman remained dedicated to working in the hospitals, and he returned to Washington as soon as he was physically fit.

Months later, on March 6, 1865, he received a letter from his mother explaining that his brother George, who had survived the poor conditions experienced at many prisoner of war camps, had been released and was now coming home to Brooklyn on medical leave. Walt went home not only to see his brother, but because he thought that the war was progressing so well for the Union that it was the perfect time to publish his book.

Whitman signed a contract with printer Peter Eckler to produce five hundred copies of Drum-Taps. Publishing proceeded smoothly until the morning of April 15, 1865, when Abraham Lincoln's death was reported. Whitman was deeply saddened by his passing. Over the following months he would divide his time between Brooklyn and the capital while also adding to his compilation of poems. His poem "When Lilacs Last in the Dooryard Bloom'd" was extremely popular. It was this success — Roy Morris Jr. later wrote that this would be the final success of his career — that finally led to the publication of Drum-Taps, along with a 24-page insert called Sequel to Drum-Taps, on October 28, 1865.

== Contents and themes ==
=== Patriotism and the purpose of war ===
Whitman's writings in Drum-Taps appear to be separated into different loosely congregated sections without plainly saying this. Within the first group of poems, Whitman expresses both exuberance and doubts in regard to the imminent conflict. Both Lincoln and Whitman had a like-minded philosophy that the sole objective of the war was to preserve the "more perfect union." Lincoln often expressed this belief and stated that the issue of slavery should be and only would be addressed if it contributed to this preservation. Poems in this first section such as “First O Songs of Prelude” (originally “Drum Taps”) demonstrate this vociferous Unionist pride. That poem and others like it among the first part, such as "Song of the Banner at Daybreak," serve as a rallying cry for the Northern population.

These poems also demonstrate Whitman's belief that this war is a good thing for America's ideals. He believes that, without such a conflict and threat to society, those ideals could be taken for granted and lost to decay. It seems that war takes binary oppositions, people at all different levels of society, and tethers them together toward a righteous and common purpose. However, Whitman also knows, at least aesthetically at this point, that war does have its horrors. He conveys this through the poem "The Centenarian's Story" in which a veteran of George Washington's campaign in the Revolutionary War recalls for a Civil War volunteer both the heroism and bravery of watching men charge willingly into terribly perilous situations and the horror of watching a large proportion of this mass of men be slaughtered.

=== Imagery ===
The next group of poems is unique in Whitman's work. These poems present a mode of seeing unarguably associated with the discovery and development of photography. Poems such as "Cavalry Crossing a Ford", "Bivouac on a Mountain Side", "An Army Corps on the March", and "By the Bivouac's Fitful Flame" all vividly describe an army that is on the move during a hard day's march, at rest as the daytime fades away, the sensation of marching into combat, and the sleepless night of a soldier sitting at a fire's side, respectively. It is with this vigorous imagery that Whitman describes the evolution of the participants in this war. For example, "By the Bivouac's Fitful Flame" relentlessly describes the hollow feeling a soldier begins experience as his naïve enthusiasm for war slips away and he must now come to grips with the terror and suffering of conflict. The poet's sense of the ennobling struggle abates and now he presented with a challenge to prove his strength in the face of such terror. Much the same way that the Union must demonstrate its strength in the face of this conflict it has feared for over a decade. Whitman's imagery is interesting in how it shifts between poems. These poems have easy-rhyming rhythms that strip away his fondness of bombastic complexity and simply reports what is there (almost in the same way as a journalist). Conversely, poems in other sections have no such simple flow, instead using free verse which forces the reader to discover this higher meaning before they can even truly enjoy the poem.

=== Suffering in the Civil War ===
Drum-Taps also explores the great suffering, death, and injury that occurred during the Civil War. Poems range from the unequivocal suffering experienced by a mother who learns of the wounding and consequential death of her son in "Come Up from the Fields Father" to the camaraderie of "Vigil Strange I Kept on the Field One Night" which tells the story of a soldier who watches one of his fellow soldiers die at his side before continuing on in the battle he is engaged in. During the night he later returns to the corpse to pay his respects to his dead friend and recall how much this young man meant to him in life one last time. "Come Up From the Fields Father" gives a reader perspective into wide reach that the suffering of war has. It mocks any sense of security a reader might have in regard for war as it demonstrates that war can cause one suffering whether they are on a battlefield in Gettysburg or a farm in Kansas. John Burroughs, Whitman's early biographer, after gaining the perspective from Whitman of what his goal with Drum-Taps was, would write that "War can never be to us what it has been to the nations of all ages down to the present; never the main fact--the paramount condition, tyrannizing over all the affairs of national and individual life; but only an episode, a passing interruption."

General Robert E. Lee would also famously comment that “It is well that war is so terrible — lest we should grow too fond of it.” Ironically, it is this terrible pain and suffering synthesized in war that also creates such intimate bonds among the men who participate in, illustrated in "Vigil Strange." This poem is interesting in that it does not stretch to melodrama to exaggerate the tragic reality of war but rather to mock the poet's futile effort to keep up with it. It is only when the sun has set and the battle ends that the poet can go properly grieve his departed companion, telling the corpse of the great passion he had for him in life.

=== From the hospital ===
The last major theme that is consistent throughout a considerable proportion of the poems shows the perspective of the war from the hospitals. The significance of this theme is that the poet chooses not to focus on the grand events happening on the fields but the consequences of those events and the repercussions they had. A poem that demonstrates the immense power of this after-effect is "The Wound-Dresser". This poem describes how, years after the war, children ask Whitman to tell them about the war. Whitman recollects his days treating the wounded, "Where they lie on the ground after the battle brought in" or in "the rows of the hospital tent, or under the roof'd hospital, To the long rows of cots up and down each side". He says to the children, "The crush'd head I dress.... The neck of the cavalry-man with the bullet through and through I examine.... From the stump of the arm, the amputated hand, I undo the clotted lint.... The hurt and wounded I pacify with soothing hand.... Many a soldier's loving arms about this neck have cross'd and rested, Many a soldier's kiss dwells on these bearded lips". The poem "develops the idea of a tender, salvific older man who is so Christ-like that the parallel need never be made explicit."

Another poem that describes this magnitude of aftermath is "The Artillery Man's Vision". The flashback in this poem is quite different from the one in "The Wound-Dresser". It does not pertain a memory being voluntarily remembered but instead a fantasy that has abducted the sleepless veteran. This is interesting for two reasons. Its nocturnal setting where a man fails to get any sleep and is instead forced to relive some of the most difficult times in his life is consistent with what we now refer to as post-traumatic stress. The other is the severity of the experience. The dream is so vivid and so realistic that it could pass for reality, yet the man is able to recognize that it is an illusion. This leads one to wonder how faithfully this vision is depicting reality; it seems that the horror of the actual history is so brutal that it has taken over the imagination.

== Poems ==
The collection originally consisted of 53 poems:

- "Drum-Taps"
- "Shut not your doors to me proud Libraries"
- "Cavalry crossing a ford"
- "Song of the Banner at Day-Break"
- "By the bivouac's fitful flame"
- "1861"
- "From Paumanok starting I fly like a bird"
- "Beginning my studies"
- "The Centenarian's Story"
- "Pioneers! O Pioneers!"
- "Quicksand years that whirl me I know not whither"
- "The Dresser"
- "When I heard the learn'd Astronomer"
- "Rise O Days from your fathomless deeps"
- "A child's amaze"
- "Beat! beat! drums!"
- "Come up from the fields father"
- "City of ships"
- "Mother and babe"
- "Vigil strange I kept on the field one night"
- "Bathed in war's perfume"
- "A march in the ranks hard-prest, and the road unknown
- "Long, too long, O land"
- "A sight in camp in the day-break grey and dim"
- "A farm picture"
- "Give me the splendid silent sun"
- "Over the carnage rose prophetic a voice"
- "Did you ask dulcet rhymes from me?"
- "Year of meteors"
- "The Torch"
- "Years of the unperform'd"
- "Year that trembled and reel'd beneath me"
- "The Veteran's vision"
- "O tan-faced Prairie-boy"
- "Camps of green"
- "As toilsome I wander'd Virginia's woods"
- "Hymn of dead soldiers"
- "The ship"
- "A Broadway pageant"
- "Flag of stars, thick-sprinkled bunting"
- "Old Ireland"
- "Look down fair moon"
- "Out of the rolling ocean, the crowd"
- "World, take good notice"
- "I saw old General at bay"
- "Others may praise what they like"
- "Solid, ironical, rolling orb"
- "Hush'd be the camps to-day"
- "Weave in, weave in, my hardy soul"
- "Turn, O Libertad"
- "Bivouac on a mountain side"
- "Pensive on her dead gazing, I heard the mother of all"
- "Not youth pertains to me"

== See also ==
- Sequel to Drum-Taps
