= William Pannapacker =

American acadmeic

- Education: Ph.D., History of American Civilization, Harvard University, 1999; A.M in English and American Literature at Harvard University, 1995; M.A. in English at University of Miami, 1993; a B.A. in English at Saint Joseph's University, 1990.
- Occupations: Professor emeritus of English, higher education journalist, consultant, administrator, and fundraiser.
- Employer(s): Baird & Warner Realtors
- Organization(s): Andrew W. Mellon Foundation, The Chronicle of Higher Education, Great Lakes Colleges Association.
- Known for: Columnist for The Chronicle of Higher Education, professor emeritus of English, expertise on American literature, urban studies, church-affiliated education, online learning, social media, general education reforms, grand challenges, community-based partnerships, multi-institutional collaborations, high-impact learning practices, arts and humanities foundations, institutional change, and diversity, equity, and inclusion.

William Pannapacker is a professor emeritus of English, and former higher education journalist, consultant, administrator, and fundraiser. He is the author of Revised Lives: Walt Whitman and Nineteenth-Century Authorship, and numerous articles on literature, higher education, and the Digital Humanities published by Cambridge University Press, Duke, Harvard, Princeton, and Routledge. He was a regular columnist for The Chronicle of Higher Education from 1998 to 2014, and he has been a contributor to The New York Times, The North American Review and Slate Magazine. Pannapacker has received $2.3 million in grants from the Andrew W. Mellon Foundation. He was the founding director of the Mellon Scholars Program in the Arts and Humanities at Hope College in Holland, Michigan, from 2009 to 2016; the director of the Digital Liberal Arts Initiative of the Great Lakes Colleges Association, from 2013 to 2015; the DuMez Professor of English, from 2015 to 2019; senior director of The Andrew W. Mellon Foundation Grand Challenges Presidential Initiative, from 2016 to 2019, and Professor and Senior Director of Andrew W. Mellon Foundation Programs and Initiatives at Hope College, from 2019-2022.

== Biography ==
Pannapacker earned a B.A. degree in English from Saint Joseph's University in 1990, an M.A. degree in English from the University of Miami in 1993, and an A.M. degree in English and American Literature in 1995 as well as a Ph.D. degree in the History of American Civilization in 1999 both from Harvard University. His doctoral dissertation was on the poet Walt Whitman, and his scholarly emphasis is 19th-century American literature and culture. He was a contributing editor on Whitman for American Literary Scholarship (Duke University Press) from 2005 to 2010. Pannapacker is one of six Harvard students since 1790 (including Ralph Waldo Emerson) to have won the Bowdoin Prize twice (1995, 1999); he is also a three-time winner of the Helen Choate Bell Prize for American Literature. He was a lecturer in Harvard's History and Literature honors concentration from 1995 to 2000, and he was a Whiting Foundation Fellow in 1998–99. Pannapacker is the author of Revised Lives: Walt Whitman and Nineteenth-Century Authorship (Routledge, 2004), and he delivered the David H. Hirsch Memorial Lecture at Brown University in 2005.

From 2000-2022, Pannapacker was a faculty member at Hope College, a liberal arts institution in Holland, Michigan, where he was Professor and Senior Director of The Andrew W. Mellon Foundation Programs and Initiatives. From 2009 to 2016, he was the founding director of the Andrew W. Mellon Foundation Scholars Program in the Arts and Humanities, an undergraduate honors concentration that integrates the arts and humanities with collaborative research in digital technologies and experiential education. In the course of leading that program at Hope College, Pannapacker named and developed the "Digital Liberal Arts," a conceptual expansion of Digital Humanities for teaching institutions that has been supported by the Mellon Foundation and adopted at many colleges throughout the United States. From 2013 to 2015, Pannapacker also served as the director of the Mellon-sponsored Digital Liberal Arts Initiative of the Great Lakes Colleges Association, which sought to develop collaborations in teaching and research across the thirteen member colleges and international partners based in Morocco and Beirut. He was one of the three founding directors of the Institute for Liberal Arts Digital Scholarship (ILiADS), which has hosted an annual workshop and conference since 2015. From 2016 to 2019 Pannapacker was the senior director of the Andrew W. Mellon Foundation Grand Challenges Presidential Initiative of Hope College. This Initiative, according to Pannapacker, attempted "to show how the liberal arts have a transformative role to play in the world: that everyone across academic divisions can benefit from the critical thinking, creativity, and performance--and also the knowledge and skills--developed in complementary disciplines.". Following another award of $800,000 from the Mellon Foundation for community-based partnerships in 2019, he was appointed Senior Director of Andrew W. Mellon Foundation Programs and Initiatives at Hope College. In 2022, Pannapacker retired from Hope College with emeritus status.

Pannapacker was a columnist for The Chronicle of Higher Education from 1998 to 2014. His more than 150 contributions (under the pen-name "Thomas H. Benton" between 2002 and 2011) addressed graduate education in the humanities, the academic job market, alternative careers, experiences on the tenure track, liberal arts education, museum design, libraries, educational technology, fundraising, the annual conventions of the Modern Language Association, and career transitions. In the Chronicle's 50th-anniversary retrospective in 2016, Pannapacker is described as having "helped change the conversation about graduate education, as humanities leaders began to explore limits on enrollment and training students for alternative careers." In 2017 Pannapacker's social media writing was anthologized in Best American Nonrequired Reading, edited by Sarah Vowell. In 2021, Pannapacker resumed writing for The Chronicle of Higher Education for an invited series on the changing academic workplace and transitioning into a new career. In 2022-23 he served as a development officer for Chicago Jesuit Academy, a tuition-free, all-Black middle school on the West Side of Chicago. He currently lives in Oak Park, Illinois.
