= Charles Aldrich (curator) =

American politician (1828–1908)

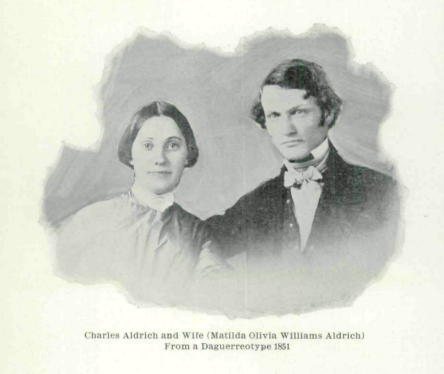
Charles Aldrich and Matilda Olivia Williams Aldrich in 1851

Charles Aldrich (1828–1908) was an American journalist, bureaucrat, collector, and curator from Iowa. Known colloquially as the first "conservator of Iowa history", Aldrich founded a number of important state collections including what is now known as the State Historical Museum of Iowa.

== Early life ==
Charles Aldrich was born in Ellington, New York in 1828. He apprenticed as a printer with a newspaper. He attended Jamestown Academy in Jamestown, New York for one year. Aldrich moved to Webster City, Iowa in 1857 with his wife and started the Hamilton Freeman newspaper, the first newspaper in Webster City.

== Civil War service ==
At the outbreak of the Civil War, Aldrich began to author editorials in various newspapers supporting the Union and its political platform. He enlisted in the 32nd Iowa Infantry Regiment in 1862, but was discharged due to his health in 1864. At one point Aldrich was offered a promotion to the rank of captain but refused the position. He continued to write editorials on the subject of the Civil War and the Union after being discharged.

== Legal and political career ==
From 1860 to 1862 and 1866 to 1870, Aldrich was chief clerk of the Iowa House of Representatives, where he would have seen many documents and pieces of ephemera foundational to the legal history of the state. He was a member of the Iowa House of Representatives from 1882-1883. In that capacity, he authored legislation related to historic preservation and natural resources.

== Legacy ==
While pursuing his career, Aldrich began to amass multiple collections of material related to the history of Iowa. He and his wife donated their large collection of autographs and paper ephemera to the state in 1884. He began advocating for an Iowa Historical Collection, which was founded in 1892 and he was appointed the first curator of the accompanying Iowa Historical Department. As curator, he founded a collection of Iowa newspapers, established the state archives, and made connections with the Smithsonian Institution to receive materials for the budding museum. The Historical Department's Museum existed in the basement of the state capitol until a new building was built in 1899.

Aldrich's first wife, Matilda Olivia Williams, was an avid ornithologist along with Aldrich. He was a founding member of the American Ornithologists' Union in 1883 and included natural history specimens in the Iowa Historical Department's collections. He was active in the State Historical Society and edited the journal Annals of Iowa beginning in 1893. He never retired from his position as curator and died in 1908.
