= Walt Whitman and Abraham Lincoln =

Relationship between 19th-century poet and politician

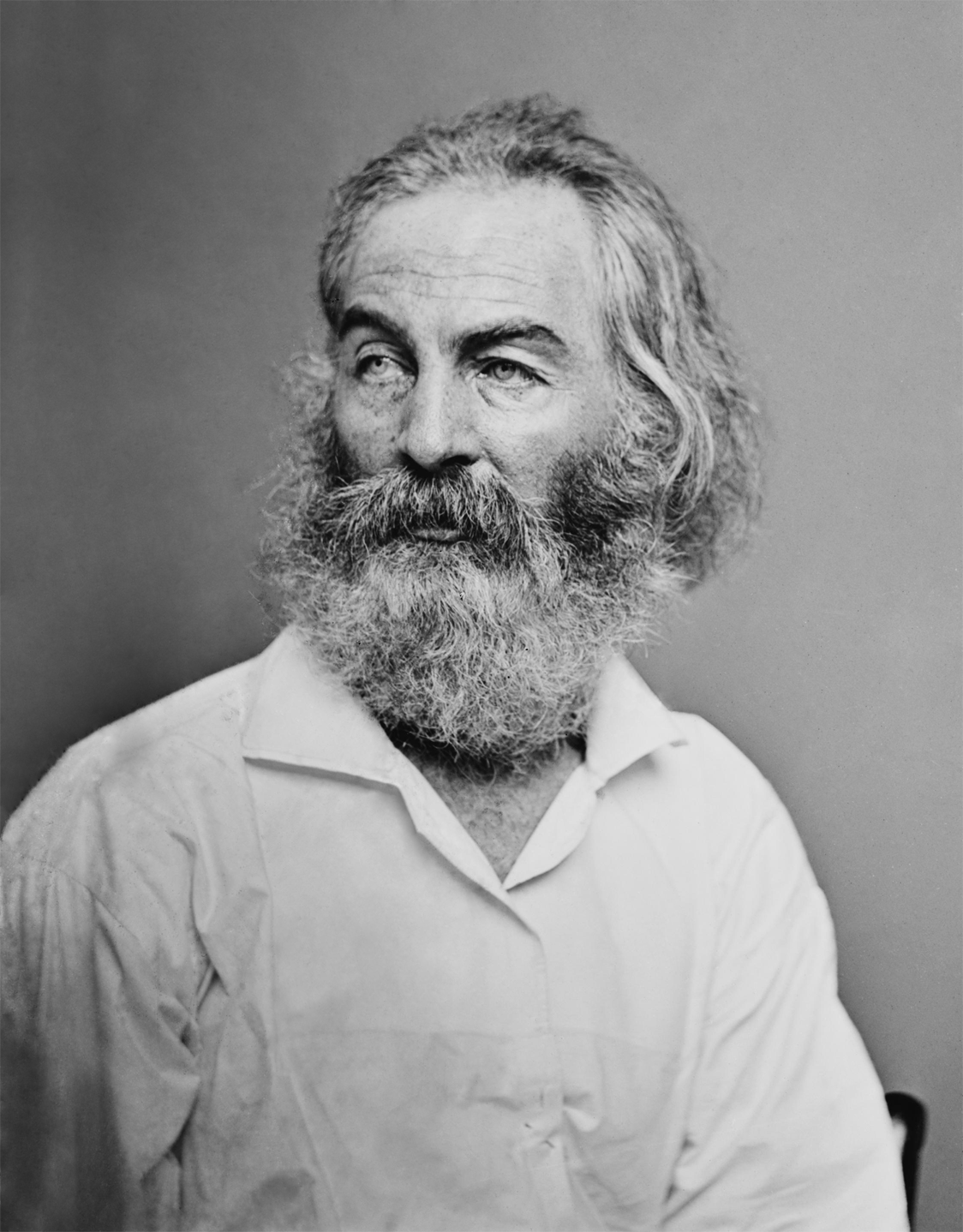
Whitman c. 1860

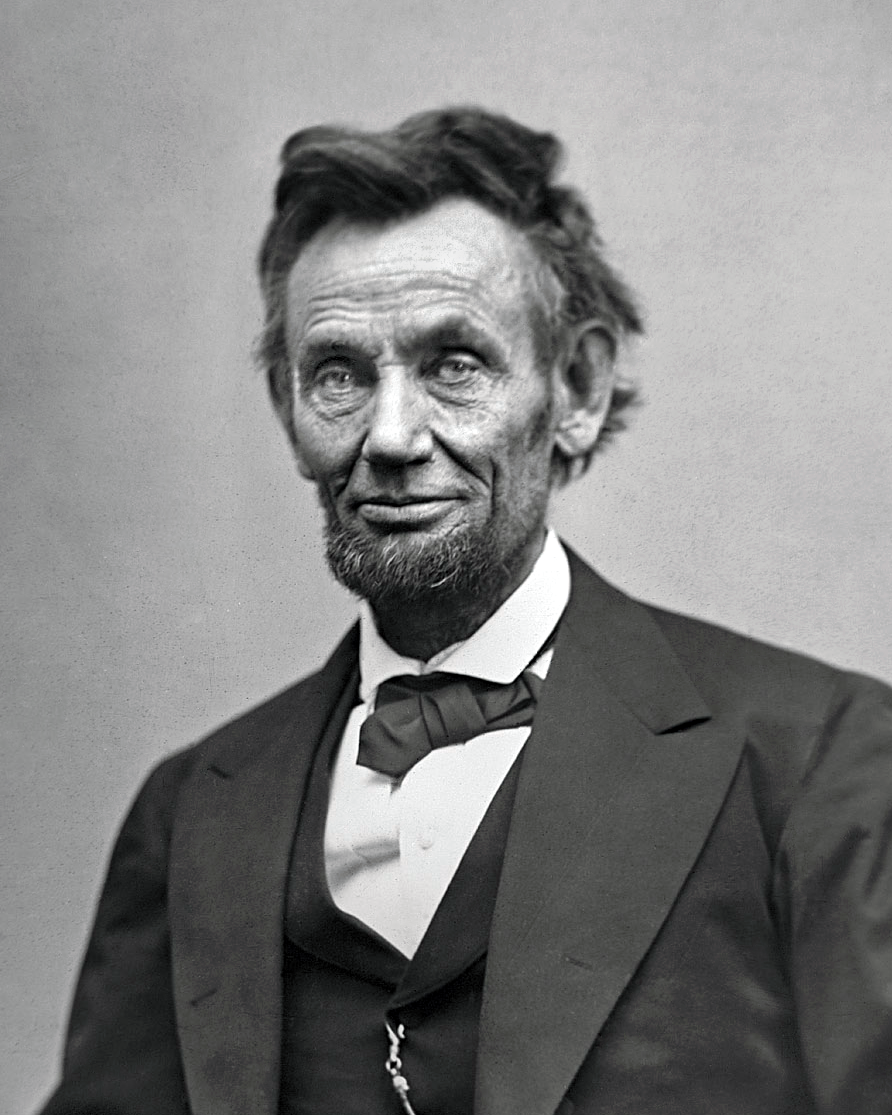
Lincoln in February 1865, two months before his death

The American poet Walt Whitman greatly admired Abraham Lincoln, the 16th president of the United States, and was deeply affected by his assassination, writing several poems as elegies and giving a series of lectures on Lincoln. The two never met. Shortly after Lincoln was killed in April 1865, Whitman hastily wrote the first of his Lincoln poems, "Hush'd Be the Camps To-Day". In the following months, he wrote two more: "O Captain! My Captain!" and "When Lilacs Last in the Dooryard Bloom'd". Both appeared in his collection Sequel to Drum-Taps later that year. The poems—particularly "My Captain!"—were well received and popular upon publication and, in the following years, Whitman styled himself as an interpreter of Lincoln. In 1871, his fourth poem on Lincoln, "This Dust Was Once the Man", was published, and the four were grouped together as the "President Lincoln's Burial Hymn" cluster in Passage to India. In 1881, the poems were republished in the "Memories of President Lincoln" cluster of Leaves of Grass.

From 1879 to 1890, Whitman's lectures on Lincoln's assassination bolstered the poet's own reputation and that of his poems. Critical reception to Whitman's Lincoln poetry has varied since their publication. "O Captain! My Captain!" was very popular, particularly before the mid-20th century, and remains one of his most popular works, despite slipping in critical assessment since the early 1900s. "Lilacs" is considered one of Whitman's finest works.

== Background ==
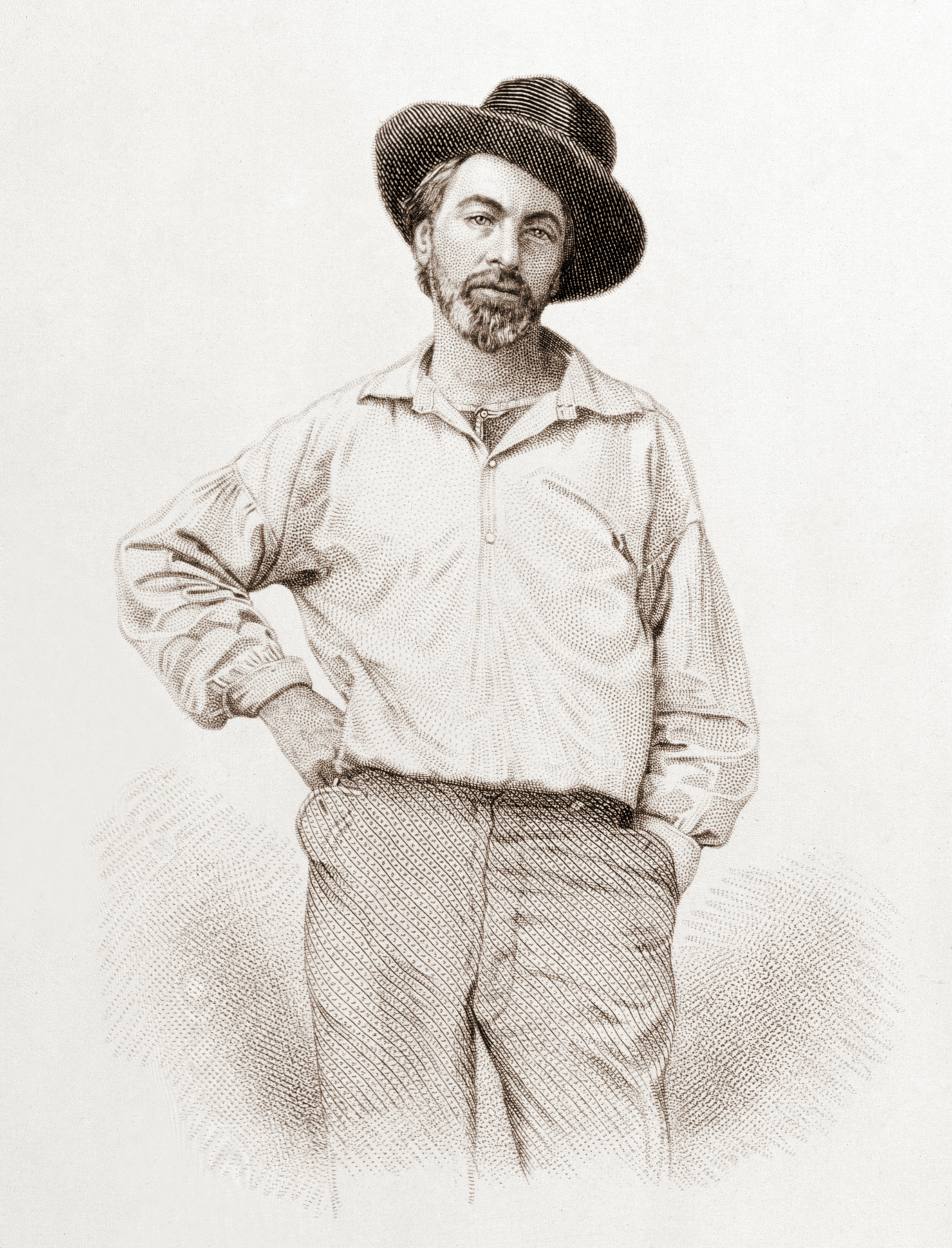
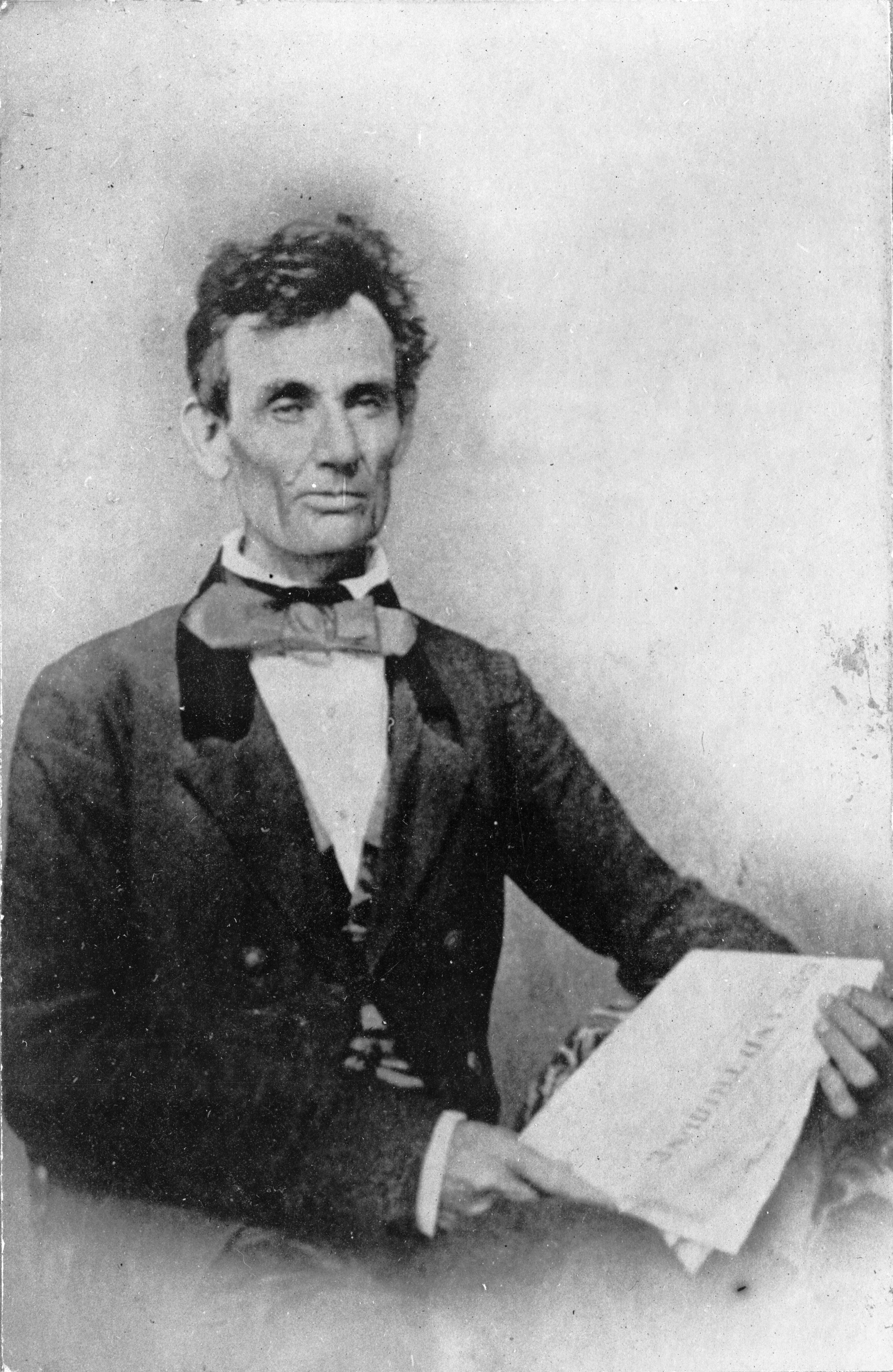
Whitman (left) and Lincoln (right) c. 1854 when they were 35 and 45 years old respectively

=== Abraham Lincoln ===
Abraham Lincoln was raised on the frontier in the early 19th century, living in Kentucky and Indiana before settling in Illinois, serving in the state legislature, and marrying Mary Todd. He gained a reputation on the national stage with his 1858 debates against Stephen Douglas during a race for a seat in the United States Senate, which Douglas won. Two years later Lincoln was elected the 16th president of the United States. In that capacity, he led the United States through the American Civil War until his assassination on April 14, 1865.

=== Walt Whitman ===
Walt Whitman established his reputation as a poet following the release of his poetry collection Leaves of Grass (1855); the volume came to wider public attention following a positive review by American transcendentalist lecturer and essayist Ralph Waldo Emerson. Whitman intended to write a distinctly American epic and had developed a free verse style inspired by the cadences of the King James Bible. Reviewing Leaves of Grass, some critics objected to Whitman's blunt depiction of sexuality and what they perceived as an undercurrent of homoeroticism.

"[T]he December 16 [1862] New York Herald [reported] that 'First Lieutenant G. W. Whitmore' was counted among the many wounded at the Battle of Fredericksburg, Virginia." Despite the misspelling of the surname in the report, the Whitman family in Brooklyn "braced for the worst".... That very afternoon, Walt Whitman ... set out for Virginia via Washington, D.C., to find his younger brother." After he found his brother, Walt Whitman remained in Washington, where he had a series of government jobs—first with the Army Paymaster's Office and later with the Bureau of Indian Affairs. He volunteered in the army hospitals as a nurse. Whitman's wartime experience greatly influenced his poetry, and he shifted to writing reflections on death and youth, the brutality of war and patriotism. He later wrote that the war offered "some pang of anguish—some tragedy, profounder than ever poet wrote."

Whitman's brother, Union Army soldier George Washington Whitman, was taken prisoner in Virginia in September 1864, and held for five months in Libby Prison, a Confederate prisoner-of-war camp near Richmond, Virginia. On February 24, 1865, George was granted a furlough to return home because of his poor health. Whitman traveled to his mother's home in New York to visit him. While visiting Brooklyn, Whitman signed a contract to have his collection of Civil War poems, Drum-Taps, published. In June 1865, the Secretary of the Interior, James Harlan, discovered a copy of Leaves of Grass and fired Whitman from the Bureau of Indian Affairs, describing the collection as "obscene".

== Whitman and Lincoln ==
To say that Whitman admired Lincoln would be a terrific understatement—he saw the Union itself, America itself, incarnated in him.

— C. K. Williams (2010)

In 1856, Whitman wrote a lengthy description of his ideal president: a "heroic" figure who was cunning and bold in temperament and knowledgeable about the world; a "Lincolnesque figure" according to Whitman biographer Justin Kaplan. He also opined on this hypothetical president's physical attributes: bearded and dressed in "a clean suit of working attire". Whitman explicitly mentions blacksmiths and boatmen as ideal precursor occupations. Two years later, Whitman first mentioned Lincoln by name in writing. That year, he supported Stephen Douglas over Lincoln for election to the United States Senate. Whitman first saw Lincoln as the president-elect traveled through New York City on February 19, 1861. Whitman noticed Lincoln's "striking appearance" and "unpretentious dignity", and trusted his "supernatural tact" and "idiomatic Western genius". Whitman's admiration for Lincoln steadily grew in the following years; in October 1863 Whitman wrote in his diary "I love the President personally."

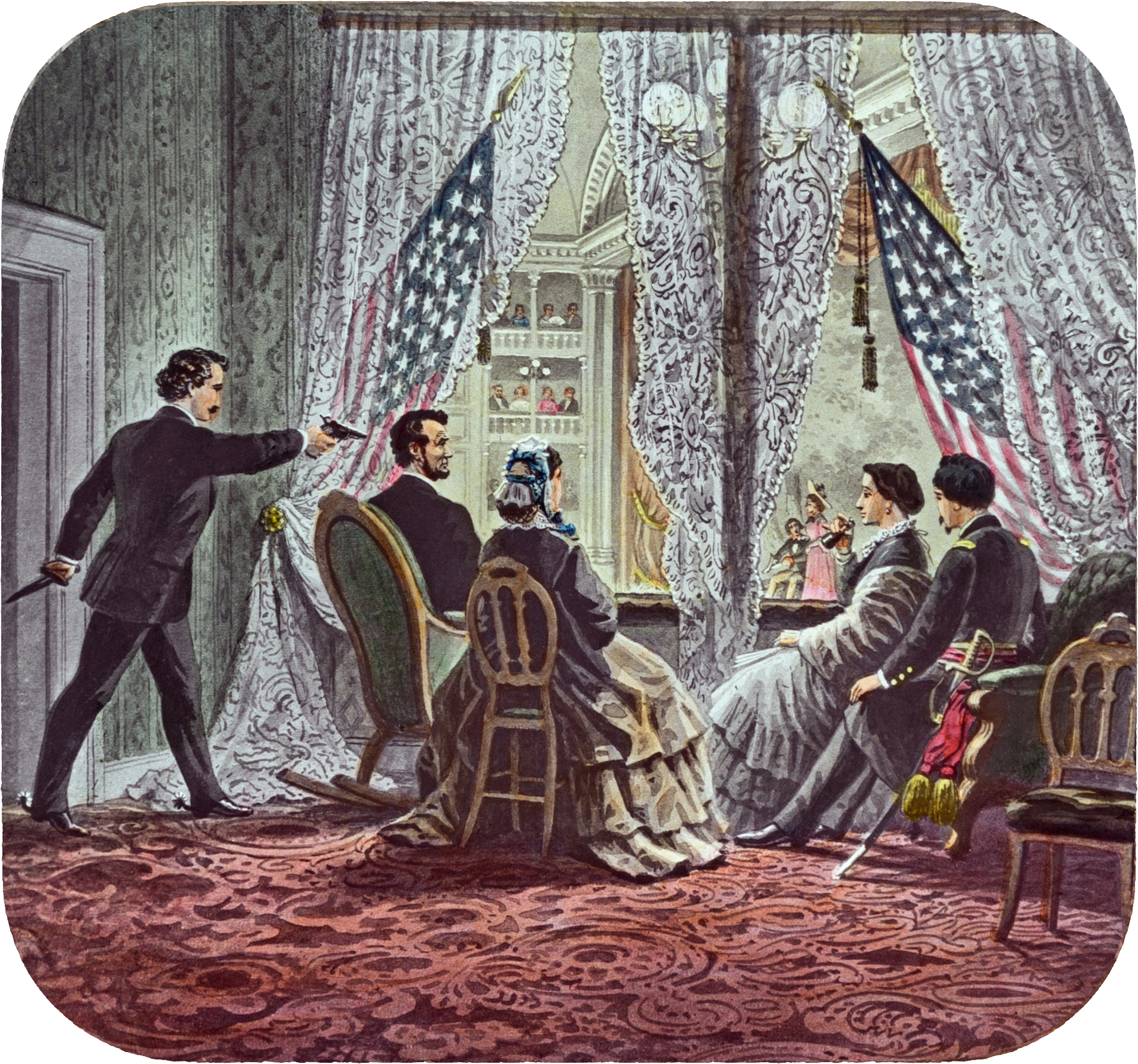
Shown in the presidential booth of Ford's Theatre (left to right: assassin John Wilkes Booth, Abraham Lincoln, Mary Todd Lincoln, Clara Harris, and Henry Rathbone)

Although they never met, Whitman estimated that he saw Lincoln about twenty to thirty times between 1861 and 1865, sometimes at close quarters. Lincoln passed Whitman several times and nodded to him, interactions that Whitman detailed in letters to his mother. William Barton writes there was little "evidence of recognition", and Lincoln likely nodded to many passersby as he traveled. Whitman and Lincoln were in the same room twice: at a reception in the White House following Lincoln's first inauguration in 1861, and when Whitman visited John Hay, Lincoln's private secretary, at the White House. (Note: Whitman, as a government employee, was visiting to ask Hay for a pass to go to New York City and vote in the 1864 United States presidential election, which he received.)

In August 1863, Whitman wrote in The New York Times, "I see the president almost every day". Later that year, Whitman wrote a letter describing the president's face as a "Hoosier Michel Angelo, so awful ugly it becomes beautiful". In the letter he described Lincoln as captaining the "ship of state". Whitman considered himself and Lincoln to be "afloat in the same stream" and "rooted in the same ground". They shared similar views on slavery and the Union—"Both were committed to free labor and territorial expansion, but the preservation of the Union was more important than either". Whitman was a consistent supporter of Lincoln's politics, and similarities have been noted in their literary styles and inspirations. Whitman later said that, "Lincoln gets almost nearer me than anybody else."

It remains unclear how much Lincoln knew about Whitman, though he knew of him and his admiration for him. There is an account of Lincoln reading Leaves of Grass in his office, and another of the president saying "Well, he looks like a man!" upon seeing Whitman in Washington, D.C., but these accounts may be fictitious. Whitman was present at Lincoln's second inauguration in 1865 and left D.C. shortly after to visit his family.

On April 14, 1865, shortly after the end of the American Civil War, Lincoln was assassinated, and he died the next morning. Whitman was residing in Brooklyn while on a break from his job at the Department of the Interior when he heard the news. He recalled that although breakfast was served, the family did not eat and "not a word was spoken all day".

== Whitman's poetry on Abraham Lincoln ==
Poems in "Memories of President Lincoln"
Title	First published
"Hush'd Be the Camps To-Day"	Drum-Taps, May 1865
"O Captain! My Captain!"	The Saturday Press, November 4, 1865
"When Lilacs Last in the Dooryard Bloom'd"	Sequel to Drum-Taps, late 1865
"This Dust Was Once the Man"	Passage to India, 1871

The first poem that Whitman wrote on Lincoln's assassination was "Hush'd Be the Camps To-Day", dated April 19, 1865—the day of Lincoln's funeral in Washington. (Note: Whitman thought that Lincoln would be buried in Washington on April 19, writing "the shovel'd clods that fill the grave" in "Hush'd Be The Camps To-Day". Lincoln lay in state in Washington and his funeral train departed the city. He was buried in Springfield, Illinois.) Near the publication of Drum-Taps, Whitman decided the collection would be incomplete without a poem on Lincoln's death and hastily added "Hush'd Be the Camps To-Day". He halted further distribution of the work and stopped publication on May 1, primarily to develop his Lincoln poems. He followed that poem with "O Captain! My Captain!" and "When Lilacs Last in the Dooryard Bloom'd". "My Captain" first appeared in The Saturday Press on November 4, 1865, and was published with "Lilacs" in Sequel to Drum-Taps around the same time. Although Sequel to Drum-Taps had been published in early October, copies were not ready for distribution until December, and English professor Amanda Gailey described Whitman's decision to publish "My Captain" in The Saturday Press as a teaser for Sequel.

In 1866, Whitman's friend William D. O'Connor published The Good Gray Poet: A Vindication, a short, promotional work for Whitman. O'Connor presented Whitman as Lincoln's "foremost poetic interpreter", proclaiming "Lilacs" as "the grandest and the only grand funeral music poured around Lincoln's bier".

Whitman did not compose "This Dust was Once the Man", his fourth on Lincoln, until 1871. The four poems were first grouped together in the "President Lincoln's Burial Hymn" cluster of Passage to India (1871). Ten years later, in a later edition of Leaves of Grass, the grouping was named "Memories of President Lincoln". The poems were not revised substantially following their publication. (Note: Whitman substantially revised portions of his poetry collection Leaves of Grass over the course of his life.)

Whitman wrote two other poems on Lincoln's assassination that were not included in the cluster. Shortly before Whitman's death, he wrote a final poem with the president as its subject, titled "Abraham Lincoln, Born Feb. 12, 1809", in honor of Lincoln's birthday. It appeared in the New York Herald on February 12, 1888. The poem has only two lines and is not well known.

== Lectures ==
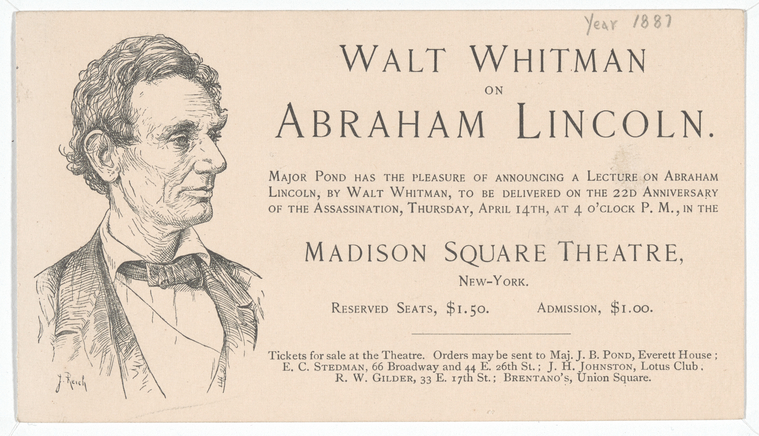
An announcement of Whitman's lecture at Madison Square Theatre

In 1875, Whitman published Memoranda During the War. The book, a collection of diary entries, includes a telling of Lincoln's assassination from the perspective of someone who was present. The New York Sun published that section in 1876 to a positive reception. Whitman, by then in failing health, presented himself as neglected, unfairly criticized, and deserving of pity in the form of financial aid. Richard Watson Gilder and several of Whitman's other friends soon suggested he give a series of "Lincoln Lectures" aimed at raising both funds and Whitman's profile. Whitman adapted his New York Sun article for the lectures.

Whitman gave a series of lectures on Lincoln from 1879 to 1890. They centered on the assassination but also covered the years leading up to and during the American Civil War. Whitman occasionally gave poetry readings, such as "O Captain! My Captain!". The lectures were generally popular and well received. In 1980, Whitman biographer Justin Kaplan wrote that Whitman's 1887 lecture in New York City and its after-party marked the closest he came to "social eminence on a large scale".

In 1885, Whitman contributed an essay about his experiences with Lincoln to a volume being compiled by Allen Thorndike Rice. Novelist Bram Stoker gave at least one lecture on Lincoln and discussed the deceased president with Whitman in November 1886. The two met when Stoker wrote a lengthy letter to Whitman in 1872 and were friends thereafter. Robert J. Havlik in the Walt Whitman Quarterly wrote that their "mutual respect for Lincoln" was a foundation of their relationship.

== Reception ==
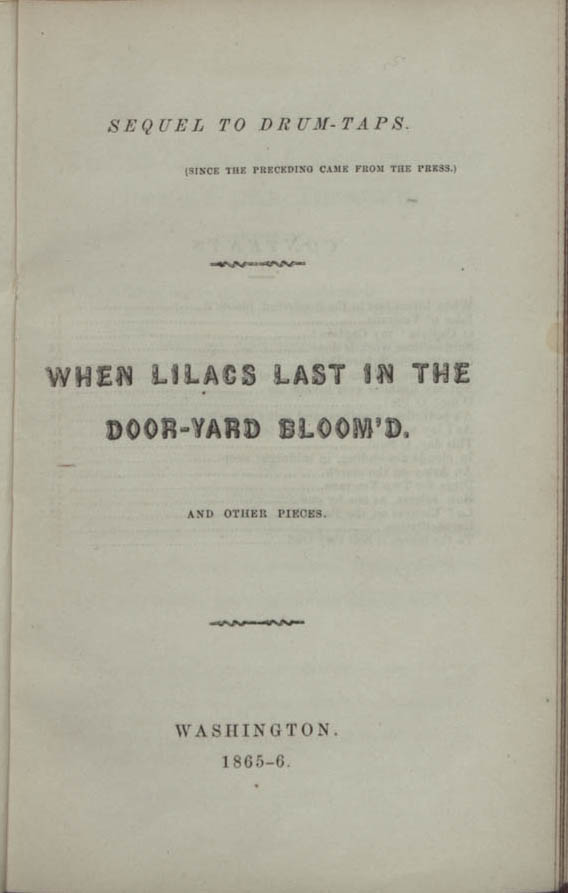
The title page of Sequel to Drum-Taps

The cluster of poems improved Whitman's reputation, and included one considered by critics to be his best ("Lilacs") and one of his most popular ("My Captain!"). Historian Roy Basler deemed "My Captain!" and "Lilacs" Whitman's two most famous poems. The scholar William Pannapacker called "My Captain" the most popular poem ever written on Lincoln.

Drum-Taps and Sequel received mixed reviews. Some poems were generally praised, particularly "My Captain!" and "Lilacs". Henry James accused Whitman of exploiting the tragedy of Lincoln's death to serve himself. By contrast, Sequel to Drum-Taps convinced William Dean Howells that Whitman "has cleansed the old channels of their filth, and pours through them a stream of blameless purity". Whitman's Lincoln poetry was not immediately popular. His lectures helped to raise the perception of the poems around the nation, and by the late 1870s "My Captain" was often listed with James Russell Lowell's "Commemoration Ode" as some of the best poetry honoring Lincoln. As Whitman's profile grew, many people assumed he had been close to the president during his life.

After 1881, Whitman became known increasingly for "My Captain!" and the persona he cultivated through events like the lectures. "My Captain!" became Whitman's most popular poem; it was his only poem to be anthologized before his death. Following Whitman's death in 1892, his obituary in the New York Herald noted that to most people "Whitman's poetry will always remain as a sealed book, but there are few who are not able to appreciate the beauty of 'O Captain! My Captain!'" In 1920, Léon Bazalgette, a French literary critic, wrote "Lilacs" and "My Captain!" had established Whitman as the poet "who sings the American nation" and that his Lincoln poems represented "the heart of America in tears". In 1943, Henry Seidel Canby wrote that Whitman's poems on Lincoln have become known as "the poems of Lincoln".

Opinions of "My Captain!" and "Commemoration Ode" remained high until the 20th century. Following a critical reappraisal, critics wrote about the poems' conventionality and lack of originality. "Lilacs" superseded them as one of the most prominent poems of the Civil War era. In 1962, Whitman biographer James E. Miller described several poems in the cluster as "competently executed expressions of public sentiment on a high public occasion", but lacking the sentimentality and powerful symbolism of "Lilacs". The scholar of American literature Charles M. Oliver wrote in 2006 that Whitman's works on Lincoln represent him at his most eloquent.

== Analysis ==
Terrible, cleansing, and restorative for the nation, the Civil War became the central imaginative event of Whitman's middle life and Lincoln his personal agent of redemption, a symbolic figure who transcended politics, leadership, and victory.

— Justin Kaplan (1980)

=== Whitman as interpreter of Lincoln ===
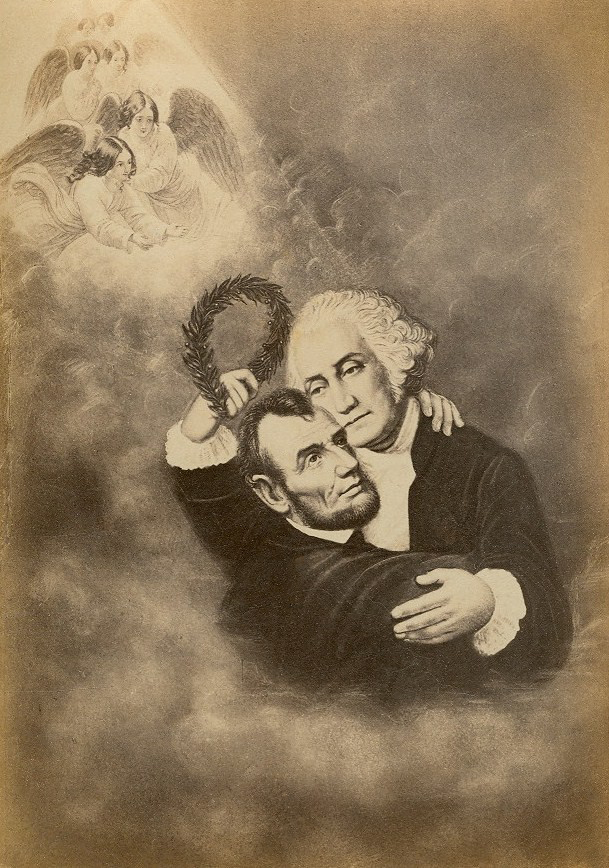
A depiction of George Washington welcoming Abraham Lincoln into Heaven. Whitman owned a copy of this image and displayed it at his home in Camden.

Shortly after Lincoln's assassination, hundreds of poems were composed about his death. Historian Stephen B. Oates wrote that the American public had never mourned the death of a head of state so deeply. Whitman wrote poems on the topic, presenting himself as an "interpreter of Lincoln" to increase the readership of Leaves of Grass while honoring a man he admired. In 2004, Pannapacker described the poetry as a "mixture of innovation and opportunism". Scholar Daniel Aaron writes that "Whitman placed himself and his work in the reflected limelight" of Lincoln's death.

The work of poets like Whitman and Lowell helped to establish Lincoln as the "first American", epitomizing the newly reunited America. Whitman portrayed Lincoln with metaphors such as the captain of the ship of state and made his assassination into a monumental event; for example, the principal metaphor in Lilacs compares Lincoln's completed life with the transient and short-lived beauty of flowers in full bloom. Aaron wrote that Whitman treated Lincoln's death as a moment that could unite the American people. The historian Merrill D. Peterson wrote to similar effect, noting that Whitman's poetry placed Lincoln's assassination firmly in the American consciousness. Kaplan considers responding to Lincoln's death to have been Whitman's "crowning challenge". However, he considers Whitman's poems such as "My Captain" and "Lilacs" to be less bold and emotionally direct than his earlier work.

Pannapacker concludes that Whitman reached the "heights of fame" through his poetry on Lincoln. He worked to fashion Lincoln as the "redeemer of the promise of American democracy". The philosopher Martha C. Nussbaum considers Lincoln to be the only individual subject of love in Whitman's poetry. The Chilean critic Armando Donoso wrote that Lincoln's death allowed Whitman to find significance in his feelings surrounding the Civil War. Several critics consider Whitman's response to Lincoln's death to memorialize all those who had died in the Civil War. For Whitman, Lincoln's death was the culmination of all the tragedies the Civil War had brought, according to scholar Betsy Erlikka.

Critics have noted Whitman's departure from his earlier poetry in his Lincoln poems; for instance, in 1932, Floyd Stovall felt that Whitman's "barbaric yawp" had been "silenced" and replaced by a more sentimental side; he noted an undercurrent of melancholy arising from the subject of death. Ed Folsom argues that, although Whitman may have struggled with his success coming from work uncharacteristic of his other poetry, he decided that acceptance was "preferable to exclusion and rejection".

=== Cluster ===
James E. Miller considers the cluster to make up a "sustained elegy". The first poem to be written, "Hush'd Be the Camps To-Day," is generally considered to have been written hastily as Whitman's tribute to Lincoln's funeral. The English professor Peter J. Bellis wrote that "Hush'd Be the Camps To-Day", as Whitman's first elegy to Lincoln, aimed to encapsulate the nation's grief and provide closure, like a funeral. "Hush'd" has inaccuracies and what scholar Ted Genoways describes as "stock form"; Whitman was unsatisfied by it. Gay Wilson Allen similarly argues that to Whitman the poem was not a fitting poem for the occasion, and neither was "My Captain!". Throughout the summer Whitman developed and refined his feelings and response to the assassination as he wrote "Lilacs".

Bellis notes that the poems in Sequel to Drum-Taps, mainly "Lilacs", focus on the future. Instead of describing Lincoln's burial as an endpoint, "Lilacs" follows his funeral train through "a process of renewal and return" and grapples with grief and death. The literary critic Helen Vendler also noted this progression, writing that the poems go from Lincoln's being a "dead commander" (in "Hush'd"), to "fallen cold and dead" (in "My Captain!") to "dust" (in "This Dust"). According to the academic F. O. Matthiessen, Whitman's tributes to Lincoln showed how he could make what he wrote about seem "mythical". All the elegies lack "historical specificity": Lincoln's name is not mentioned in any of the poems. Vendler argues this makes the cluster's title "misleading", because only "This Dust" actually comments on Lincoln.

Critics have noted stylistic differences among poems in the cluster; Daniel Mark Epstein felt it "may seem hard to believe" that the same writer wrote both "Lilacs" and "O Captain! My Captain!". "Hush'd", "This Dust", and "My Captain!" are instances of Whitman's subordinating himself and writing as someone else, whereas "Lilacs" is Whitman speaking. Pannapacker considers the cluster part of a larger trend in Whitman's poetry to be more elegiac. The critic Joann P. Krieg argues that the cluster succeeds "by narrowing the scale of emotion to the grief of one individual whose pain reflects that of the nation". Vendler felt that of all poetry written on Lincoln in the mid- to late-19th century, Whitman's poems have proven to "last the best".

== General sources ==
- Aaron, Daniel (1973). The Unwritten War: American Writers and the Civil War. Tuscaloosa, Alabama: University of Alabama Press. ISBN 978-0-394-46583-8.
- Allen, Gay Wilson (1997). A Reader's Guide to Walt Whitman. Syracuse, New York: Syracuse University Press. ISBN 978-0-8156-0488-4.
- Allen, Gay Wilson; Folsom, Ed, eds. (1995). Walt Whitman & the World (PDF). Iowa City, Iowa: University of Iowa Press. ISBN 978-1-58729-004-6. OCLC 44959010.
- Barton, William E. (1965) [1928]. Abraham Lincoln and Walt Whitman. Port Washington, New York: Kennikat Press. OCLC 234090069.
- Bellis, Peter J. (2019). "Reconciliation as Sequel and Supplement". In Sten, Christopher; Hoffman, Tyler (eds.). "This Mighty Convulsion": Whitman and Melville Write the Civil War. Iowa City: University of Iowa Press. pp. 69–82. ISBN 978-1-60938-664-1. OCLC 1089839323.
- Blake, David Haven (2006). Walt Whitman and the Culture of American Celebrity. New Haven, Connecticut: Yale University Press. ISBN 978-0-300-11017-3. JSTOR j.ctt1npt0h.
- Blodgett, Harold W. (1953). The Best of Whitman. New York City: Ronald Press Company. OCLC 938884255.
- Bloom, Harold (2009). Walt Whitman. New York City: Infobase Publishing. ISBN 978-1-4381-1549-8.
- Callow, Philip (1992). From Noon to Starry Night: A Life of Walt Whitman. Chicago: Ivan R. Dee. ISBN 978-1-56663-133-4. OCLC 644050069.
- Coyle, William (1962). The Poet and the President: Whitman's Lincoln Poems. New York City: Odyssey Press. OCLC 2591078.
- Csicsila, Joseph (2004). "Nineteenth-Century Poetry: Whitman, Dickinson, Alice Cary, Phoebe Cary, Larcom, Thaxter, Lanier, Tabb". Canons by Consensus: Critical Trends and American Literature Anthologies. Tuscaloosa, Alabama: University of Alabama Press. pp. 55–85. ISBN 978-0-8173-8178-3. OCLC 320324064.
- Eiselein, Gregory (1998). "'O Captain! My Captain!' (1865)". In LeMaster, J. R.; Kummings, Donald D. (eds.). Walt Whitman: an Encyclopedia. Milton Park, Abingdon: Routledge. ISBN 978-0-8153-1876-7.
- Epstein, Daniel Mark (2004). Lincoln and Whitman: Parallel Lives in Civil War Washington. New York City: Ballantine Books. ISBN 978-0-345-45799-8. OCLC 52980509.
- Erkkila, Betsy (1989). Whitman: The Political Poet. New York City and Oxford: Oxford University Press. ISBN 978-0-19-505438-5. OCLC 17548902.
- Folsom, Ed; Price, Kenneth M. (2005). Re-Scripting Walt Whitman: An Introduction to His Life and Work. Malden, Massachusetts: Blackwell Publishing. ISBN 978-0-470-77493-9.
- Gailey, Amanda (2009). "The Publishing History of Leaves of Grass". In Kummings, Donald D. (ed.). A Companion to Walt Whitman. Hoboken, New Jersey: John Wiley & Sons. pp. 409–438. ISBN 978-1-4051-9551-5.
- Genoways, Ted (2006). "Civil War Poems in 'Drum-Taps' and 'Memories of President Lincoln'". In Kummings, Donald D. (ed.). A Companion to Walt Whitman. Hoboken, New Jersey: John Wiley & Sons. pp. 522–537. ISBN 978-1-4051-2093-7.
- Kaplan, Justin (1980). Walt Whitman: A Life. New York City: Simon & Schuster. ISBN 978-0-06-053511-7. OCLC 51984882.
- Killingsworth, M. Jimmie (2007). The Cambridge Introduction to Walt Whitman. Cambridge, England: Cambridge University Press. ISBN 978-0-511-27529-6. OCLC 153956010.
- Krieg, Joann P. (2009). "Literary Contemporaries". In Kummings, Donald D. (ed.). A Companion to Walt Whitman. Hoboken, New Jersey: John Wiley & Sons. pp. 392–408. ISBN 978-1-4051-9551-5.
- Kummings, Donald D., ed. (2009). A Companion to Walt Whitman. Hoboken, New Jersey: John Wiley & Sons. ISBN 978-1-4051-9551-5.
- Loving, Jerome (1975). Civil War Letters of George Washington Whitman. Durham, North Carolina: Duke University Press. ISBN 978-0-8223-0331-2.
- Loving, Jerome (1999). Walt Whitman: The Song of Himself. Berkeley, California: University of California Press. ISBN 978-0-520-21427-9. OCLC 39313629.
- Matthiessen, F. O. (1968) [1941]. American Renaissance: Art and Expression in the Age of Emerson and Whitman. New York City: Oxford University Press. ISBN 978-0-19-972688-2. OCLC 640086213.
- Miller, James E. (1962). Walt Whitman. New York City: Twayne Publishers. OCLC 875382711.
- Morris, Roy Jr. (2000). The Better Angel: Walt Whitman in the Civil War. Oxford: Oxford University Press. ISBN 978-0-19-512482-8. OCLC 43207497.
- Oliver, Charles M. (2005). Critical Companion to Walt Whitman: A Literary Reference to His Life and Work. New York City: Infobase Publishing. ISBN 978-1-4381-0858-2.
- Pannapacker, William (2004). Revised Lives: Whitman, Religion, and Constructions of Identity in Nineteenth-Century Anglo-American Culture. Milton Park, Abingdon: Routledge. ISBN 978-1-135-92451-5.
- Pannapacker, William (2009). "The City". In Kummings, Donald D. (ed.). A Companion to Walt Whitman. Hoboken, New Jersey: John Wiley & Sons. pp. 42–59. ISBN 978-1-4051-9551-5.
- Parini, Jay (2004). The Oxford Encyclopedia of American Literature. Oxford: Oxford University Press. ISBN 978-0-19-515653-9.
- Peterson, Merrill D. (1994). Lincoln in American Memory. Oxford: Oxford University Press. ISBN 978-0-19-506570-1.
- Reynolds, David S. (1995). Walt Whitman's America: A Cultural Biography. New York City: Vintage Books. ISBN 978-0-19-517009-2.
- Seery, John Evan, ed. (2011). A Political Companion to Walt Whitman. Lexington, Kentucky: University Press of Kentucky. ISBN 978-0-8131-2655-5. OCLC 707092896.
- Sten, Christopher; Hoffman, Tyler, eds. (2019). "This Mighty Convulsion": Whitman and Melville Write The Civil War. Iowa City, Iowa: University of Iowa Press. pp. 23–32. ISBN 978-1-60938-664-1. OCLC 1089839323.
- Vendler, Helen (1988). The Music of What Happens: Poems, Poets, Critics. Cambridge, Massachusetts: Harvard University Press. ISBN 978-0-674-59152-3.
- Whitman, Walt (1961). Miller, Edwin Haviland (ed.). The Correspondence. Vol. 1 and 2. New York City: New York University Press. OCLC 471569564.
- Williams, Charles Kenneth (2010). On Whitman. Princeton, New Jersey: Princeton University Press. ISBN 978-1-4008-3433-4. OCLC 650307478.
