= Walt Whitman's lectures on Abraham Lincoln =

Series of lectures between 1879 and 1890

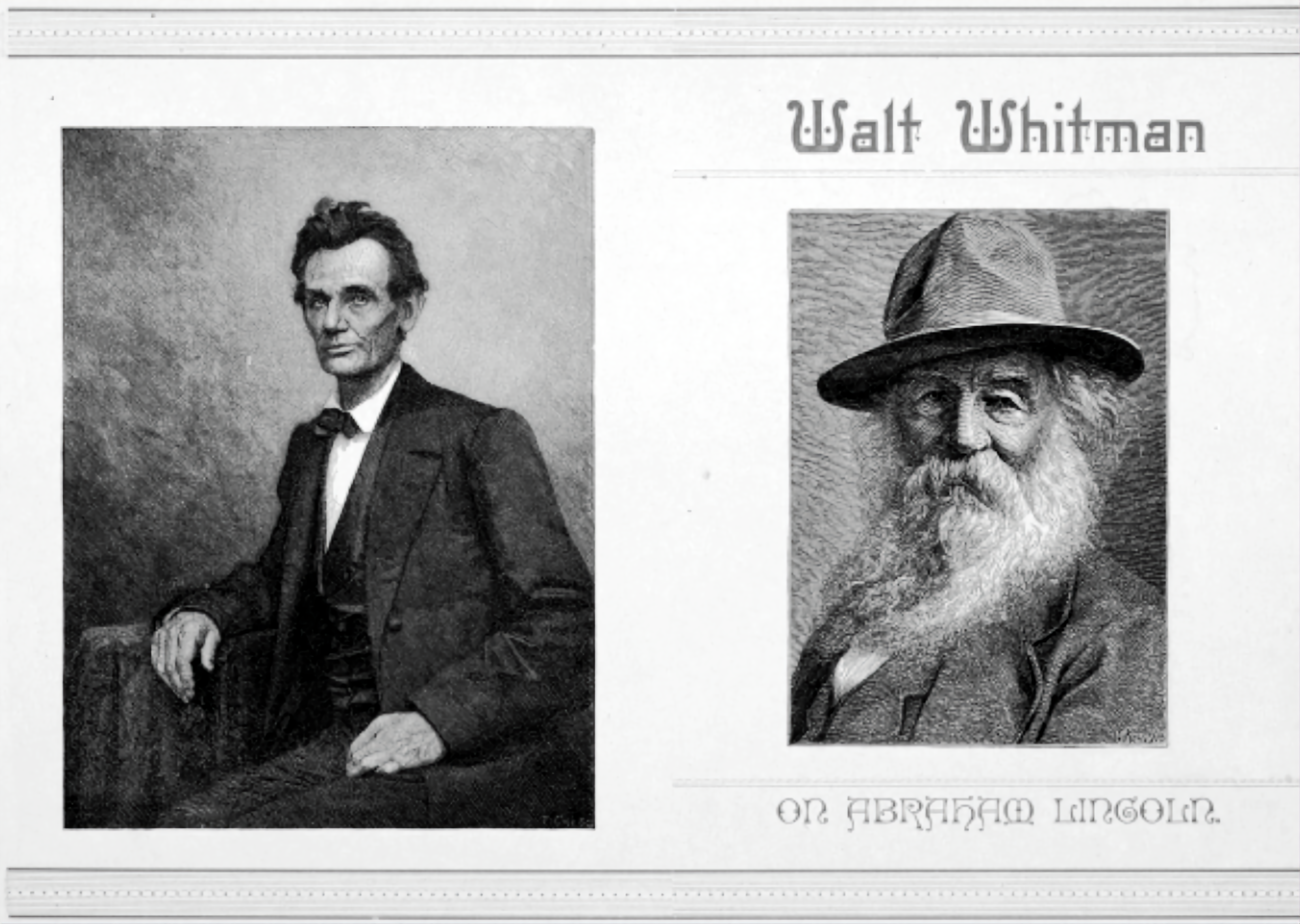
The cover for a program from one of the deliveries of Walt Whitman's lecture on Abraham Lincoln

The American poet Walt Whitman gave a lecture on Abraham Lincoln, the 16th president of the United States, several times between 1879 and 1890. The lecture centered on Lincoln's assassination, but also covered years leading up to and during the American Civil War and often included readings of poems such as "O Captain! My Captain!". The deliveries were generally well received, and cemented Whitman's public image as an authority on Lincoln.

Whitman greatly admired Lincoln and was moved by his assassination in 1865 to write several poems in the President's memory. The idea of a lecture on the topic was first proposed by his friend John Burroughs in an 1878 letter. Whitman, who had long aspired to be a lecturer, first spoke on the death of Lincoln in New York City's Steck Hall on April 14 the following year. Over the next eleven years, he delivered the lecture at least ten, and possibly as many as twenty, more times.

Many deliveries of the lecture were part of a broader speaker series or fundraising events. A delivery of the lecture in 1887 at Madison Square Theatre is considered the most successful presentation. Whitman's biographer Justin Kaplan writes that this delivery and the reception that followed was the closest Whitman came to "social eminence on a large scale", as it was attended by many prominent members of American society. Whitman later described that lecture and reception as "the culminating hour" of his life, but at another time criticized it as "too much the New York Jamboree". He gave the lecture for the last time in Philadelphia in 1890, two years before his death.

== Background ==
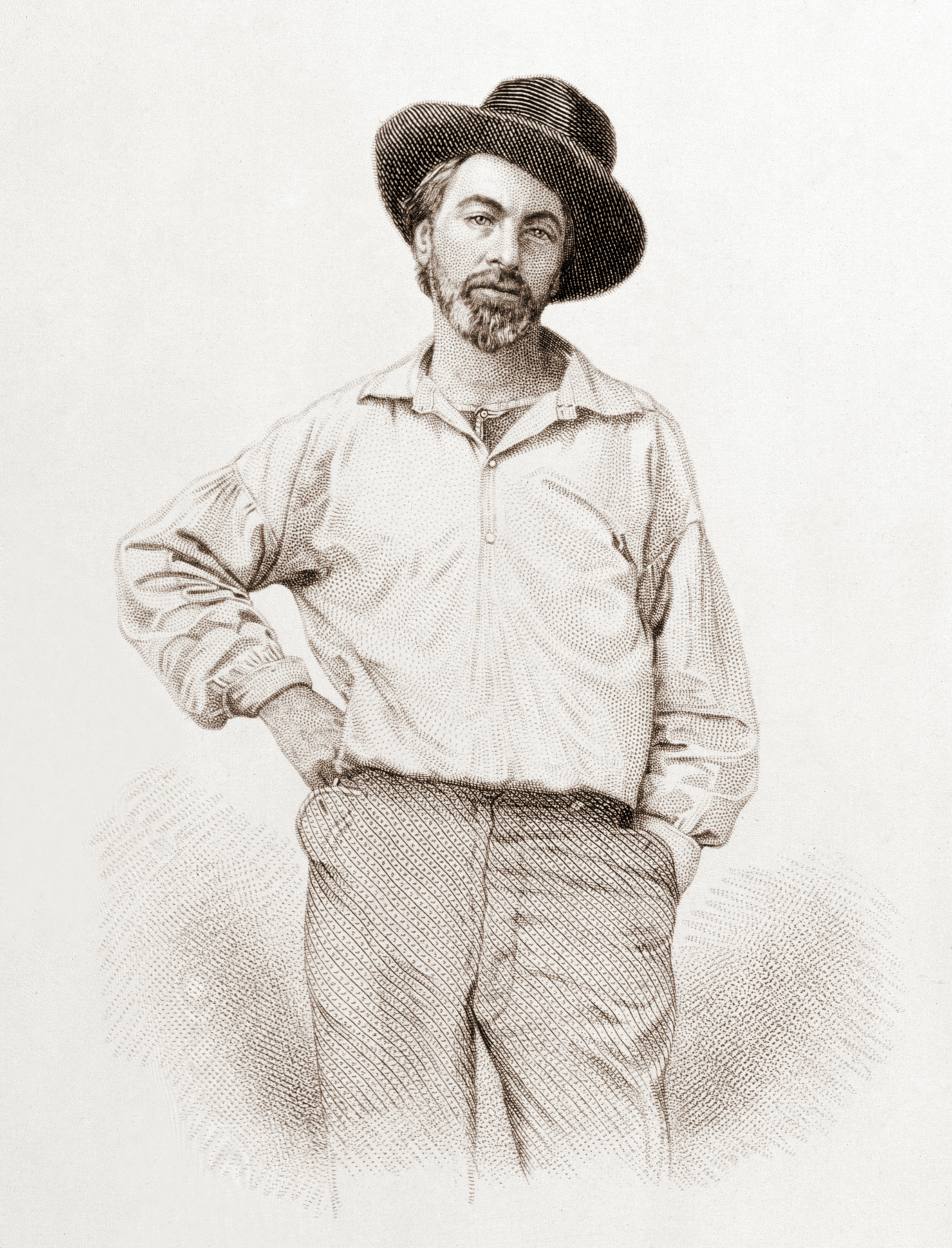
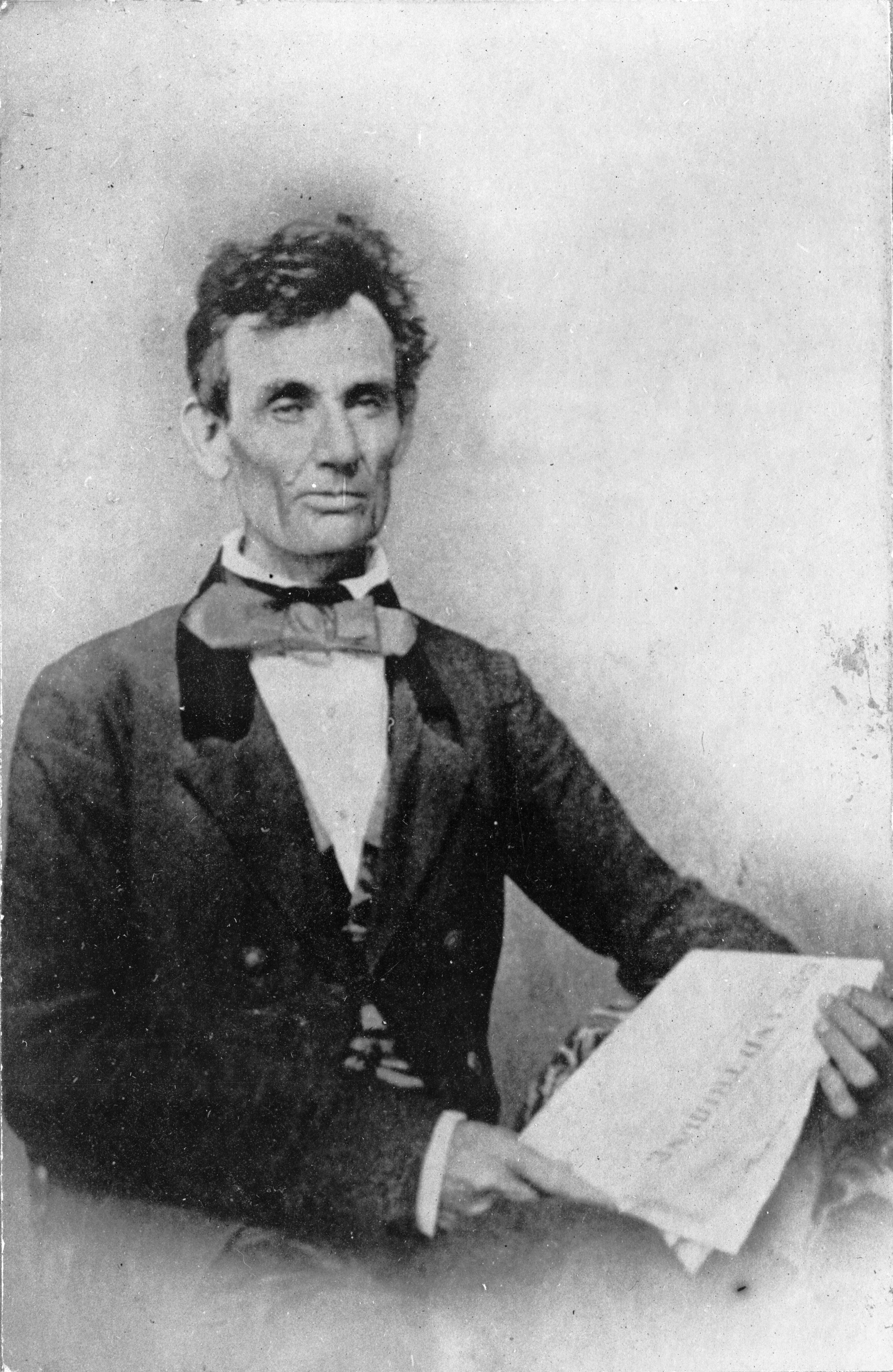
Whitman (left) and Lincoln (right), c. 1854, when they were 35 and 45 years old, respectively

Walt Whitman established his reputation as a poet in the late 1850s to early 1860s after the 1855 release of Leaves of Grass. The brief volume was controversial, with critics particularly objecting to Whitman's blunt depictions of sexuality and what the University of Virginia Libraries has described as its "obvious homoerotic overtones". At the start of the American Civil War, Whitman moved from New York to Washington, D.C., where he held a series of government jobs—first with the Army Paymaster's Office and later with the Bureau of Indian Affairs. He also volunteered in army hospitals as a nurse.

Although they never met, Whitman saw Abraham Lincoln several times between 1861 and 1865. The first time was when Lincoln stopped in New York City in 1861 on his way to Washington. Whitman greatly admired the President, writing in October 1863, "I love the President personally," and later declaring that "Lincoln gets almost nearer me than anybody else." Lincoln's assassination on April 15, 1865, greatly moved Whitman and the nation. Shortly after Lincoln's death, hundreds of poems had already been written about it. The historian Stephen B. Oates argues that "never had the nation mourned so over a fallen leader".

Whitman himself wrote four poems in tribute to the President: "O Captain! My Captain!", "When Lilacs Last in the Dooryard Bloom'd", "Hush'd Be the Camps To-Day", and "This Dust Was Once the Man". In 1875 he published Memoranda During the War, which included a narrative of Lincoln's death, and the following year he published an article on Lincoln's death in The New York Sun. Though Whitman also considered writing a book on Lincoln, he never did.

=== Whitman and lectures ===
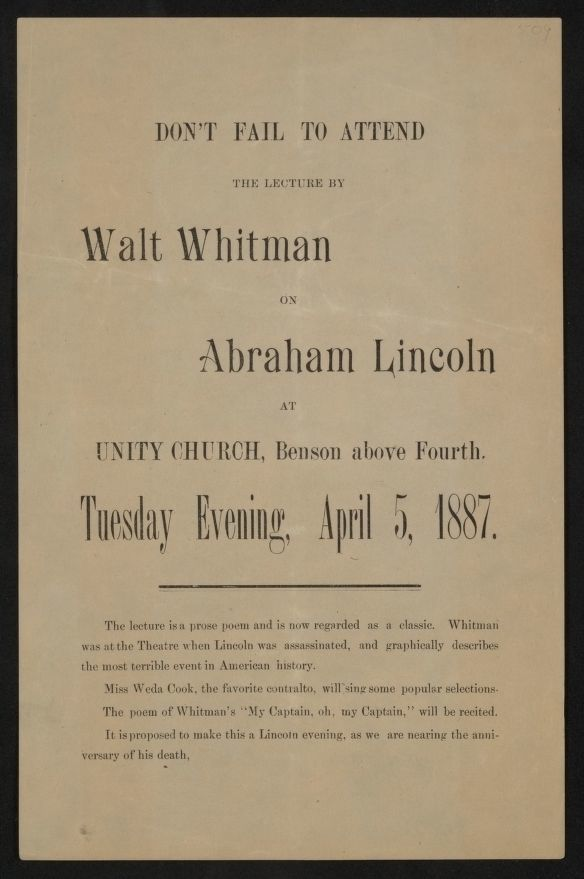
An advertisement for Whitman's Lincoln lecture in Camden, New Jersey (1887). It includes the false claim that "Whitman was at the Theatre when Lincoln was assassinated".

In the mid-19th century, public lectures in the United States became regarded as a platform for well-known Americans to reach large numbers of people. Because of this, the lecture became directly associated with celebrity and fame. By the 1870s, Whitman had long sought to be a lecturer, writing several lectures and delivering one as early as 1851, at the Brooklyn Art Union.

In a letter written on February 3, 1878, Whitman's friend John Burroughs suggested that he deliver a lecture on Lincoln's assassination. Burroughs wrote that the editor Richard Watson Gilder also supported the idea, and suggested delivery around the anniversary of the assassination, in April. On February 24, Whitman responded to Burroughs, agreeing to the proposal. The next month, Whitman began experiencing severe pain in his shoulder and was partially paralyzed; as a result, the lecture was postponed to May. On April 18, the physician Silas Weir Mitchell attributed this paralysis to a ruptured blood vessel in Whitman's brain, and in May Whitman gave up on plans for delivering the lecture that year. In March 1879, a group of Whitman's friends, including Gilder, Burroughs, and the jeweler John H. Johnston, began planning a lecture again. As part of the preparations for the first lecture, Whitman worked his New York Sun article into a format for reading aloud.

== Deliveries ==
Between 1879 and 1890 Whitman gave a lecture on the assassination of Lincoln a number of times. Money made from these lectures constituted a major source of income for him in the last years of his life, before his death in 1892.

The first lecture was given in Steck Hall, New York City, on April 14, 1879. Whitman was unable to find further bookings for the rest of the year. He did not give another lecture until April 15, 1880, in Association Hall, Philadelphia. He revised the lecture's content slightly for the second reading; it would stay in largely the same form for every subsequent delivery. Whitman gave the lecture again in 1881. No records show him delivering it in the next five years, but he gave it at least four times in 1886, and several times in the four years after. Whitman's April 15, 1887, lecture at Madison Square Theatre is considered the most successful of the deliveries, largely because it was attended by many prominent societal figures. He gave the lecture at least two further times, including his last delivery in Philadelphia on April 14, 1890, just two years before his death. The text of the lecture was published in Whitman's Complete Prose Works. Whitman also sent a written copy of the lecture to his friend Thomas Donaldson in 1886. Donaldson, in turn, sent the lecture to the author Bram Stoker, who received it in 1894.

Whitman said that he gave the lecture a total of thirteen times, but later scholars give varying numbers—estimates range as high as twenty. (Note: Barton wrote in 1928 that he considered thirteen to be too large and was able to compile a list of nine definite occasions. Loving argued in 1999 that ten was "the best estimate".) Eleven individual deliveries have been identified:

Known deliveries of Whitman's lecture on Lincoln
Date	Location	Description	Ref.
April 14, 1879	Steck Hall, New York City	Given to a group of 60 to 80 people, Whitman's first lecture on Lincoln. Whitman sat while speaking. The reception of this lecture is unknown.	
April 15, 1880	Association Hall, Philadelphia	The second known lecture, form modified slightly from the first. Whitman promoted this delivery by sending copies of the speech to several newspapers.	
April 15, 1881	Hawthorne Room of the St. Botolph Club, Boston	Over 100 attendees, including the literary critic William Dean Howells. Raised $135, (Note: equivalent to $4,500 in 2025) with tickets sold for $1 (Note: equivalent to $33 in 2025) each. Organized by the Papyrus Club. Positively received by contemporary reviewers. After the Boston lecture, James R. Osgood agreed to publish an edition of Leaves of Grass, which the historian David S. Reynolds attributes to the lecture and associated increase in perception of Whitman as a respectable figure.	
February 2, 1886	Pythian Club, Elkton, Maryland	Given at the request of Whitman's friend Folger McKinsey as part of a public lecture series organized by the Pythian Journalists' Club.	
March 1, 1886	Morton Hall, Camden		
April 15, 1886	Chestnut Street Opera House, Philadelphia	Attendees included Stuart Merrill and George William Childs. Arranged as a benefit for Whitman by actors and journalists and raised $692. (Note: equivalent to $24,800 in 2025)	
May 18, 1886	Haddonfield, New Jersey	Delivered as a fundraiser to benefit a local Episcopal Church, the Collingswood Mission, that was constructing a new building. Local newspapers later described it as "a grand success" and reported that around $22 (Note: equivalent to $790 in 2025) was raised.	
April 5 or 6, 1887	Unity Church, Camden	Delivered to Camden's Unitarian Society. Described by Reynolds as "a modest affair".	
April 14, 1887	Madison Square Theatre, New York City	Generally considered the most successful lecture: though the theatre was not very full, (Note: According to Kaplan, the theatre was a quarter filled. Loving describes the auditorium as "sparsely crowded", while contemporary observer Stuart Merrill described a "thinly scattered" crowd. However, Johnston wrote that the theatre was packed.) it was attended by notable societal figures including prominent literary figures such as James Russell Lowell, Frances Hodgson Burnett, Edmund Clarence Stedman, Wilson Barrett, Mark Twain, Frank Stockton, Mariana Griswold Van Rensselaer; the former soldier William T. Sherman; Lincoln's biographer and former private secretary John Hay; the future Cuban revolutionary José Martí; the future author Stuart Merrill; and the sculptor Augustus Saint-Gaudens. Reynolds described the lecture in 1995 as a "Barnumesque event on a high scale." It was organized by Robert Pearsall Smith and several other friends of Whitman. At the end of the lecture, the poet Edmund Clarence Stedman's granddaughter brought Whitman lilacs and he read "O Captain! My Captain!". A reception at Whitman's hotel suite after the lecture was attended by about two hundred people. Whitman later described the lecture and its aftermath as "the culminating hour" of his life; he earned $600 (Note: equivalent to $21,500 in 2025) from the event, of which $350 (Note: equivalent to $12,500 in 2025) was from Andrew Carnegie, who may not have actually attended the lecture. (Note: Sources conflict over whether Carnegie was in attendance at the lecture. Some, such as the Whitman scholars Kaplan, Krieg and Carnegie biographer Nasaw, describe him as having been there, while others, including the Whitman scholars Pannapacker and Blake, write that he did not come, despite having paid for his box. Loving writes that Carnegie was not in the box that he paid for. Sources contemporary to the lecture are similarly in conflict; The New York Times lists Carnegie as having been in attendance, while The Indianapolis Journal describes him as seated in the pit. The New York Tribune wrote that Carnegie did not reach New York City until the evening of the 15th, at which point he remained in his room, too sick to see "even his most intimate friends", and an article in The Critic wrote that Carnegie had been "unable to occupy" his box and paid Whitman $350 when he reached New York "a day or two" after the lecture.) However, Whitman also told his friend Horace Traubel that he considered the event "too much the New York Jamboree".	
April 14, 1889	New York City	Attendees included John Hay.	
April 14 or 15, 1890	Philadelphia Art Gallery, Philadelphia	Given to the Contemporary Club. Whitman, undeterred by his failing health, spoke to a crowd of three to four hundred people. (Note: While Reynolds describes the lecture as having been attended by a "cordial crowd of sixty to eighty", Whitman's friend Horace Traubel, who was at the lecture, wrote that it was attended by "3 to 4 hundred" people.) He could reportedly only climb to the building's second floor with assistance and struggled to read his manuscript. A transcript was published in the Boston Evening Transcript of April 19. This was the last lecture; Whitman died two years later.	

== Content ==
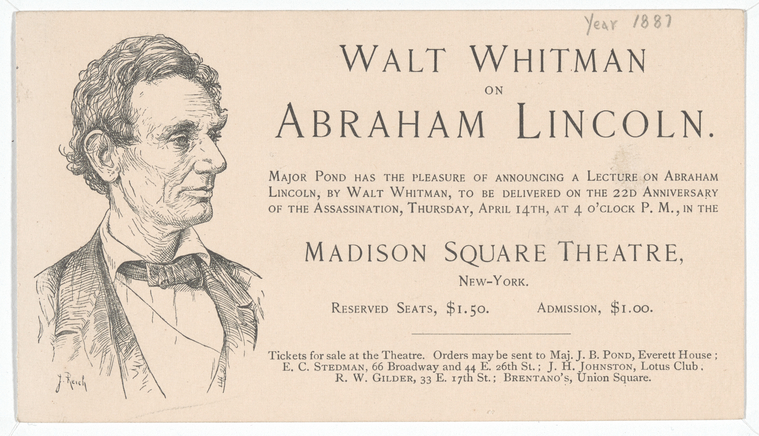
An announcement of the lecture at Madison Square Theatre

The scholar Merrill D. Peterson describes Whitman as not an orator "either in manner or appearance". Contemporary observers also described Whitman as a poor speaker, saying that his voice would become higher than normal during deliveries and describing it as "unnatural-sounding". However, other sources describe him as speaking in a low voice.

The lecture combined clippings of previously written material, such as the article Whitman had published on Lincoln's death in the New York Sun, Memoranda During the War, The Bride of Gettysburg by John Dunbar Hilton, and some new content. In preparing for the lecture, Whitman also considered the story of Demodocus, a bard in Homer's Odyssey, who Whitman wrote "sings of the bloody war between the Greeks and Trojans".

According to the scholar Leslie Elizabeth Eckel, Whitman generally began by "downplaying his ability to handle the emotionally challenging task that lay before him". He then moved into describing the rise in tensions leading up to the 1860 presidential election and America during the Civil War era. Then he would describe Lincoln's death, the main focus of the lecture. Whitman described Ford's Theatre and the assassination in vivid detail, as if he had been there. (Note: While Whitman had not seen Lincoln's assassination, he interviewed Peter Doyle, an intimate companion of Whitman who was present at Ford's Theatre when Lincoln was killed. He based his lectures in part on Doyle's account.) He identified the assassination as a force that would "condense—a nationality," equating Lincoln's killing to a sacrifice which would "cement [...] the whole people."

Whitman brought a collection of fifteen poems with him to the lecture. He often read selections from the book at the lecture's conclusion. (Note: The original copy of the book is lost, but its contents are described in Furness 1928, pp. 204–206.) He frequently read his poem "O Captain! My Captain!", but the book contained five other poems from Leaves of Grass including "Proud Music of the Storm" and "To the Man-of-War-Bird". It also had clippings of the works of other poets such as "The Raven" by Edgar Allan Poe, poems by William Collins, and a translation of the ancient Greek poet Anacreon's Ode XXXIII by Thomas Moore called "The Midnight Visitor". Whitman made his own alterations to the text of "The Midnight Visitor" that he read.

== Reception ==
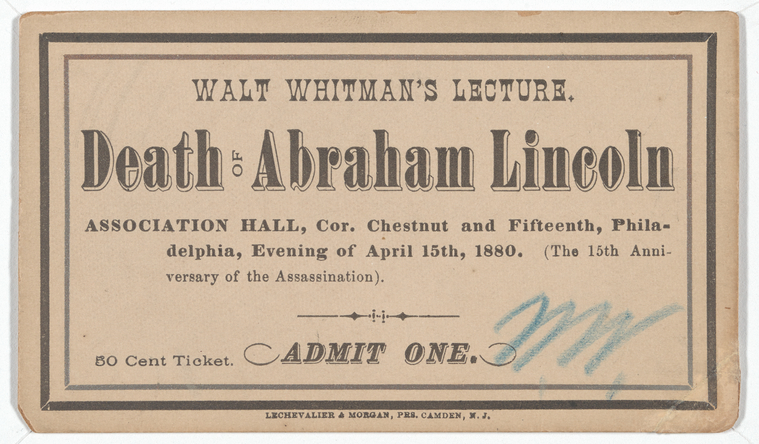
A ticket to a delivery of the lecture

Deliveries of the lecture were popular and well received. Daniel Mark Epstein, in a biography of Whitman, wrote that his deliveries were always successful and usually attracted vast amounts of positive attention in local newspapers. The literary scholar Michael C. Cohen called Whitman's lecture his "most popular text" and Reynolds describes Whitman's deliveries as making him a household name. Conversely, in 1988 the professor Kerry C. Larson wrote that the "hackneyed" sentimentality of the lecture was indicative of a decline in his creativity.

Deliveries of the lecture were generally only attended by members of high society. According to Blake, they allowed those in attendance to "pay homage to both the president and the poet". He emphasizes how Whitman used the lecture to connect America's love for Lincoln with his own poetry, namely Leaves of Grass. Whitman's biographer Justin Kaplan wrote that Whitman's 1887 lecture in New York City and its aftermath marked the closest he came to "social eminence on a large scale".

Many audience members wrote positive accounts of hearing the lecture. José Martí, a Cuban journalist who was present at the 1887 lecture, wrote one such report that was spread across Latin America. He described the crowd as listening "in religious silence, for its sudden grace notes, vibrant tones, hymnlike progress, and Olympian familiarity seemed at times the whispering of the stars". The poet Edmund Clarence Stedman wrote that "[s]omething of Lincoln himself seemed to pass into this man who loved and studied him", and the poet Stuart Merrill said that Whitman's telling of the assassination convinced him that "I was there, [that] the very thing happened to me. And this recital was as gripping as the messengers' reports in Aeschylus."

Whitman also used the lecture to further perception of himself as a "public historian". Promotional materials for the lecture often falsely claimed that Whitman had known Lincoln well and had been in Ford's Theatre on the night of the assassination. An advertisement for his Elkton, Maryland, lecture in 1886 even said that Whitman had been in the room with Lincoln when he was shot. Whitman's lecture was intended to give the impression of presenting a factual account, with a tone that scholar Martin T. Buinicki writes is "pointedly historical". The English scholar Gregory Eiselein contrasts Whitman's depiction of Lincoln's death in his lecture with that in his poem "When Lilacs Last in the Dooryard Bloom'd", noting that "Lilacs" has a tone that Eiselein describes as "musical, ethereal, often abstract, [and] heavily symbolized." Blake describes Whitman's deliveries of his lecture and the respect they received from high society as representing a final "triumph" for Whitman, over the "slander and scorn" he had once experienced from the same group. Blake goes on to write that regularly delivering the lecture became "vital to [Whitman's] permanent achievement of [fame]."

== See also ==
- Cultural depictions of Abraham Lincoln

== Bibliography ==
- Allen, Gay Wilson (1967). The Solitary Singer: A Critical Biography of Walt Whitman. New York: New York University Press. OCLC 276385.
- Azarnoff, Roy S. (September 1, 1963). "Walt Whitman's Lecture on Lincoln in Haddonfield". Walt Whitman Review. IX: 65–66.
- Barton, William E. (1965) [1928]. Abraham Lincoln and Walt Whitman. Port Washington, New York: Kennikat Press. ISBN 978-0-8046-0018-7. OCLC 1145780794.
- Blake, David Haven (2006). Walt Whitman and the Culture of American Celebrity. New Haven, Connecticut: Yale University Press. ISBN 978-0-300-11017-3.
- Buinicki, Martin T. (2011). Walt Whitman's Reconstruction: Poetry and Publishing Between Memory and History. Iowa City: University of Iowa Press. ISBN 978-1-60938-069-4.
- Callow, Philip (1992). From Noon to Starry Night: A Life of Walt Whitman. Chicago: Ivan R. Dee. ISBN 978-1-56663-133-4. OCLC 644050069.
- Cohen, Michael C. (2015). The Social Lives of Poems in Nineteenth-Century America. Philadelphia: University of Pennsylvania Press. ISBN 978-0-8122-4708-4. JSTOR j.ctt15hvz5p.
- Cushman, Stephen (2014). Belligerent Muse: Five Northern Writers and How They Shaped Our Understanding of the Civil War. Chapel Hill: The University of North Carolina Press. ISBN 978-1-4696-1877-7. OCLC 875742493.
- Epstein, Daniel Mark (2004). Lincoln and Whitman: Parallel Lives in Civil War Washington. New York City: Ballantine Books. ISBN 978-0-345-45799-8. OCLC 52980509.
- Furness, Clifton Joseph (1928). Walt Whitman's Workshop: A Collection of Unpublished Manuscripts. Cambridge, Massachusetts: Harvard University Press. OCLC 217561.
- Glicksberg, Charles I., ed. (2016) [1933]. Walt Whitman and the Civil War: A Collection of Original Articles and Manuscripts. Philadelphia: University of Pennsylvania Press. ISBN 978-1-5128-0167-5. JSTOR j.ctv51338s.
- Golden, Arthur (October 1, 1988). "The Text of a Whitman Lincoln Lecture Reading: Anacreon's 'The Midnight Visitor'". Walt Whitman Quarterly Review. 6 (2): 91–94. doi:10.13008/2153-3695.1208. ISSN 0737-0679. Archived from the original on January 10, 2021.
- Havlik, Robert J. (1987). "Walt Whitman and Bram Stoker: The Lincoln Connection". Walt Whitman Quarterly Review. 4 (4): 9–16. doi:10.13008/2153-3695.1148.
- Kaplan, Justin (1980). Walt Whitman: A Life. New York: Simon & Schuster. ISBN 978-0-671-22542-1. OCLC 6305249.
- Krieg, Joann P. (1998). A Whitman Chronology. Iowa City: University of Iowa Press. ISBN 978-0-87745-654-4.
- Larson, Kerry C. (1988). Whitman's Drama of Consensus. Chicago: University of Chicago Press. ISBN 978-0-226-46908-9.
- Levin, Joanna; Whitley, Edward (2018). Walt Whitman in Context. Cambridge: Cambridge University Press. ISBN 978-1-108-31447-3.
- Loving, Jerome (1999). Walt Whitman: The Song of Himself. Berkeley: University of California Press. ISBN 978-0-520-21427-9. OCLC 39313629.
- Marinacci, Barbara (1970). O Wondrous Singer! An Introduction to Walt Whitman. New York: Dodd, Mead & Company. OCLC 64241.
- Miller, James E. (1962). Walt Whitman. New York: Twayne Publishers. OCLC 875382711.
- Morris, Roy Jr. (2000). The Better Angel: Walt Whitman in the Civil War. Oxford: Oxford University Press. ISBN 978-0-19-512482-8. OCLC 43207497.
- Moyne, Ernest J. (December 1975). "Folger McKinsey and Walt Whitman". Walt Whitman Review. 21 (4): 135–144.
- Nasaw, David (2006). Andrew Carnegie. New York: Penguin. ISBN 978-0-14-311244-0.
- "Notes". The Critic. VII (173): 211. April 23, 1887. Archived from the original on October 4, 2022.
- Pannapacker, William (2004). Revised Lives: Whitman, Religion, and Constructions of Identity in Nineteenth-Century Anglo-American Culture. Milton Park, Abingdon: Routledge. ISBN 978-1-135-92451-5.
- Peck, Garrett (2015). Walt Whitman in Washington, D.C.: The Civil War and America's Great Poet. Charleston, South Carolina: The History Press. ISBN 978-1-62619-973-6.
- Peterson, Merrill D. (1995). Lincoln in American Memory. Oxford: Oxford University Press. ISBN 978-0-19-802304-3.
- Reynolds, David S. (1995). Walt Whitman's America: A Cultural Biography. New York: Knopf. ISBN 978-0-394-58023-4. OCLC 30547827.
- Traubel, Horace (1982). Traubel, Gertrude; White, William (eds.). With Walt Whitman in Camden: September 15, 1889–July 6, 1890. Vol. 6. Carbondale: Southern Illinois University Press. OCLC 8856880.
- Trimble, W. H. (1905). Walt Whitman and Leaves of Grass: An Introduction. London: Watts & Company. OCLC 5319070.
- Whitman, Walt (2007). Grier, Edward F. (ed.). Notebooks and Unpublished Prose Manuscripts. Vol. III: Camden. New York: New York University Press. ISBN 978-0-8147-9437-1.
- Whitman, Walt (1892). Complete Prose Works. Philadelphia: David McKay. OCLC 1260590.
