= Passage to India =

A Passage to India is a 1924 novel by English author E. M. Forster.

Passage to India may also refer to:

- Passage to India (Whitman), 1871 poetry collection, including 1869 title poem, by American poet Walt Whitman
- A Passage to India (play), 1960 dramatization of Forster novel by Indian-American playwright Santha Rama Rau
- "A Passage to India", 1965 television adaptation of Forster novel, directed by Waris Hussein for BBC's Play of the Month
- A Passage to India (film), 1984 British-American adaptation of Forster novel by David Lean
