= Proofs of Genius =

2015 book by Amanda Gailey

Proofs of Genius: Collected Editions From the American Revolution to the Digital Age
- First edition
- Author: Amanda Gailey
- Language: English
- Genre: Nonfiction
- Published: 2015
- Publisher: University of Michigan Press
- Publication place: United States
- Media type: eBook
- Pages: 172
- ISBN: 9780472072750
- OCLC: 934653413

Proofs of Genius: Collected Editions From the American Revolution to the Digital Age is a 2015 book by Amanda Gailey. The book explores collected editions and how they impact American literature and the cultural landscape. Gailey is an associate professor in the English department at University of Nebraska–Lincoln.
