= Nebraskans Against Gun Violence =

Political organization

- Established: 2014
- Tax ID no.: 47-5236959 (EIN)
- Key people: Amanda Gailey, Melody Vaccaro
- Website: nebraskansagainstgunviolence.com

Nebraskans Against Gun Violence (NAGV) is a political advocacy organization headquartered in Lincoln, Nebraska with a mission "to support evidence based firearm policy." It advocates for safe storage of firearms and policies intended to make firearms inaccessible to children.

Founded in 2014, NAGV was incorporated as a nonprofit organization in 2015.

== Activity ==
NAGV views gun violence as a public health crisis and supports the funding of research, community programming, education, and policy to reduce gun violence. Group members advocate with legislators, write Op-eds, organize events, and appear as speakers at vigils memorializing victims of school shootings, asking for rules to prevent kids from bringing guns to schools. NAGV opposed a 2022 proposal to legalize carrying of a concealed handgun without a permit, and opposed a 2021 proposal by governor Pete Ricketts to make Nebraska a pro-gun "sanctuary state."

NAGV representatives were invited to meet with US presidents Barack Obama in 2016 and Joe Biden in 2022 as a part of their administrations' gun control policy efforts. The group is critical of the National Rifle Association of America's political influence.

NAGV opposed a plan in which the Omaha Police Department agreed to trade expired ballistic helmets and bulletproof gear to a local business called 88 Tactical, in exchange for rifle magazines. The number 88 is used by white supremacists to stand for Heil Hitler. According to the Southern Poverty Law Center, NAGV executive director Melody Vaccaro believes this racist allusion and other white nationalist symbols are used by 88 Tactical intentionally. The proposed trade was removed from the Omaha City Council agenda following NAGV's objections.

Omaha police and 16 other Nebraska police departments did not submit reports on domestic violence, as required by law, from 2014 through 2019. NAGV discovered the missing reports when compiling statewide statistics involving firearms.
