= Papyrus Club =

The Papyrus Club was a literary organization in Boston, Massachusetts. Founded in 1872, and existing until approximately 1923, the Club contained and hosted many of the great literary and journalistic minds of its time, including Robert Benchley, Mark Twain and Walt Whitman.

The society organized Whitman's April 15, 1881 lecture on the death of Abraham Lincoln.

== Bibliography ==
- Reynolds, David S. (1995). Walt Whitman's America: A Cultural Biography (1st ed.). New York City: Knopf. ISBN 0-394-58023-0. OCLC 30547827.
- Billy Altman, Laughter's Gentle Soul: The Life of Robert Benchley. (New York City: W. W. Norton, 1997. ISBN 0-393-03833-5).
- New York Times, "The Papyrus Club Guests. The Ladies Night Banquet - An Imitable Speech By Mark Twain." February 25, 1881
- The Bostonian Society, research archives collection number MS0068
