= Donald Kummings =

American professor of literature (1940–2017)

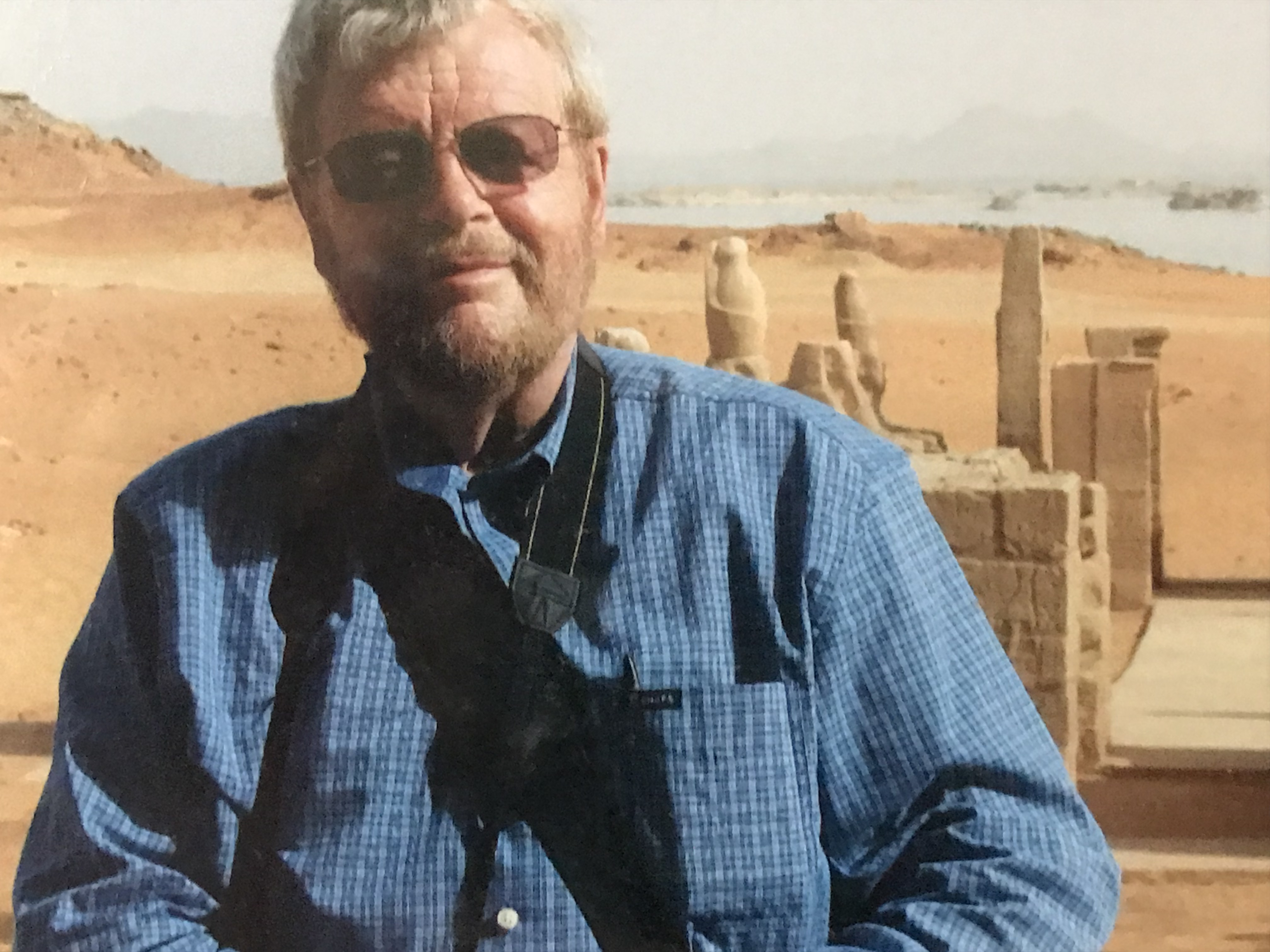
Donald Kummings was an avid traveler

Donald Dale Kummings (July 28, 1940 - November 10, 2017) was an American professor, poet and scholar of literature, best remembered for his research on poet Walt Whitman. For 36 years he served as a professor of English at University of Wisconsin–Parkside.

== Early life and education ==
Kummings was born in 1940 to Estelle and Herman Kummings in Lafayette, Indiana. He graduated from Monticello High School and earned his B.A. in creative writing from Purdue University in 1962, following with M.A. in English in 1964 from the same university. In 1971 he earned a Ph.D. in English and American Studies from Indiana University Bloomington.

== Teaching ==
Kummings taught for more than 43 years. He started his teaching career as a teaching assistant at Purdue University in 1963. He also taught at Adrian College and Indiana University before coming to Parkside in 1970. He retired in 2006 as a professor of English at University of Wisconsin–Parkside.

He was a co-organizer of the Parkside's Foreign Film Series for 35 years.

Donald Kummings earned a number of teaching awards for his contributions in the university, culminating with the Wisconsin Professor of the Year from the Carnegie Foundation for the Advancement of Teaching in 1997.

== Bibliography ==
=== Books on Walt Whitman ===
Kummings published four books on Walt Whitman:

- Walt Whitman, 1940-1975: A Reference Guide (Boston: G.K.Hall & Co., 1982. xiv, 264 pages) ISBN 978-0816178025
- Approaches to Teaching Whitman’s "Leaves of Grass" (New York: Modern Language Association of America, 1990. x, 192 pages) ISBN 978-0873525381
- Walt Whitman: An Encyclopedia (Co-editor, with J.R. LeMaster. New York and London: Garland Publishing. 1998. Xxxii, 847 pages) ISBN 9780815318767. In 2010 this book became available online at the Walt Whitman Archive (www.whitmanarchive.org). In 2011 it was reissued under the title The Routledge Encyclopedia of Walt Whitman ISBN 978-0815318767
- A Companion to Walt Whitman (Oxford, England and Malden, Massachusetts: Blackwell Publishers, 2006. xvi, 607 pages) ISBN 978-1-405-12093-7. In 2007 the book became part of a multi-volume Electronic Resource: Blackwell Reference Online. In 2009 it was reissued in a paperback edition ISBN 978-1-405-19551-5

=== Poems ===
Throughout his life Kummings also wrote his own poems. In 1989 he published a collection of 20 poems The Open Road Trip (Tunnel, New York: Geryon Press, Limited, 1989. 36 pages) ISBN 0962219215, in which he explored his intimate and travel experiences. The book was awarded the Posner Poetry Prize by the Council for Wisconsin Writers.

=== Selected articles and reviews ===
Some of Donald Kummings' shorter publications on American literature:

- "Babette Deutsch," "Richard Hovey," and "Edwin Markham." Encyclopedia of American Literature." Ed. Steven R. Serafin. New York: Continuum, 1999, pages 266-267, 540-541, 719-720.
- “Henry Deringer,” “Eliphalet Remington,” and “Oliver Fisher Winchester.” Violence in America: An Encyclopedia. 3 Volumes Ed. Ronald Gottesman. New York: Charles Scribner’s Sons, 1999, Volume 1 pages 392-393; Volume 3, pages 39, 449.
- "[American] Poetry." The Oxford Companion to United States History. Ed. Paul Boyer. New York: Oxford University Press, 2001, pages 601-603.
- "Literature," "Twain, Mark (1835-1910)," Whitman, Walt (1819-1892)," Encyclopedia of the Gilded Age and Progressive Era. 3 Volumes Edited by John D. Buenker and Joseph Buenker. Armonk, New York: M.E. Sharpe, 2005, Volume 1, pages 134–140; Volume 3, pages 972–973, 1022.
