= Amanda Gailey =

American academic and activist (born 1976)

- Born: March 24, 1976 (age 50)
- Education: University of Nebraska–Lincoln; Creighton University; Phillips University
- Occupations: academic and political activist
- Employer(s): Washington University in St. Louis; University of Georgia; University of Nebraska–Lincoln
- Organization(s): Nebraskans Against Gun Violence, founder and president
- Notable work: Proofs of Genius

Amanda A. Gailey (born March 24, 1976) is an American academic and political activist. She is an associate professor of English at the University of Nebraska–Lincoln. Gailey authored Proofs of Genius in 2015.

== Education ==
Gailey did her undergraduate work at Phillips University and her graduate work at Creighton University and the University of Nebraska–Lincoln.

== Career ==
She worked at Washington University in St. Louis and University of Georgia before joining the faculty at the University of Nebraska–Lincoln. Her work, including Proofs of Genius: Collected Editions from the American Revolution to the Digital Age, focuses on nineteenth-century American literature and textual studies.

=== Activism ===
In 2017 Gailey participated in a protest of Turning Point USA, a national organization that maintains a “professor watch list.” A recruiter for the organization set up a table on the campus of the University of Nebraska–Lincoln and Gailey held a sign that said “Turning Point: Please put me on your watch list.” Another protester, graduate student Courtney Lawton, eventually lost her job for her involvement in the protest, which led to the University being placed on the American Association of University Professors’ censure list for violating Lawton’s academic freedom and due process. Governor Pete Ricketts responded to the protest by taking the unprecedented step of rescinding Gailey’s and Lawton’s Nebraska Admiral awards, which received criticism as being politically vindictive. The protest and response from politicians received considerable media attention, including an episode of This American Life called “My Effing First Amendment” that was broadcast on May 4, 2018.

As the founder and president of Nebraskans Against Gun Violence, Gailey threatened a boycott of First National Bank of Omaha unless the bank ceased its special credit card program with the National Rifle Association. Soon after the bank announced it was discontinuing the program, a number of other corporations also ended their special offers and programs with the gun rights group.

In 2018 Gailey and Catherine Koebel organized a protest in Alexandria, Virginia, that targeted Chris W. Cox, who was then the chief lobbyist of the National Rifle Association. The protest was controversial for implicating Cox's wife's business and because the protesters held a graphic gunshot image on the public sidewalk in front of Cox's home.

Gailey contributes to the political blog Seeing Red Nebraska.
