= Charles Glicksberg =

Polish-American literary critic, professor, and writer

Charles Irving Glicksberg (13 December 1900 – 14 February 1998) was a Polish-American literary critic, professor, and writer.

== Life ==
Glicksberg was born to Lillian and Isidore Glicksberg in Warsaw, Poland. He moved to the United States at a young age and became a naturalized citizen. He attended the College of the City of New York for a bachelor's degree which he received in 1923, Columbia University for a masters which he received in 1924, and the University of Pennsylvania for a PhD which he received in 1938. He was also a Fulbright Scholar at Bar-Ilan University in Israel. His PhD dissertation became the book Walt Whitman and the Civil War which was considered an important addition to the existent scholarship on Whitman. He died on February 14, 1988, in New York City, survived by his two children, three grandchildren and three great-grandchildren.

== Teaching ==
Glicksberg taught English at South Philadelphia High School for multiple years, and eventually joined Brooklyn College as a professor, becoming professor emeritus by 1971. He also taught at multiple other colleges, including the New School for Social Research and the City University of New York.

== Writing ==
Definition of Irony

The heart of irony is to be found in a contradiction which cannot be resolved and which cannot be endured and yet which is somehow lived.

— Charles Glicksberg, quoted in Frontiers

He was a prolific author, writing multiple books including Walt Whitman and the Civil War. The Saturday Review of Literature said the book is an "excellent piece of research work, designed to fill in biographical gaps by publishing newly discovered journalistic writings which Whitman wrote over the pseudonym 'Velsor Brush'", and it is a "welcomed [addition] to the shelves of all Whitman students".

Additional books include: Literature and Religion, A Study in Conflict (Southern Methodist University Press, 1960), The Self in Modern Literature (Pennsylvania State University Press, 1963), Modern Literature and the Death of God (Martinus Nijhoff, 1966), and The Literature of Nihilism (Bucknell University Press, 1975).

He was also the editor of American Literary Criticism, 1900 to 1950 (Hendricks House, 1952) and wrote multiple essays including for: The Arizona Quarterly, The Humanist, The Colorado Quarterly, The New Leader, and the Curriculum Journal.

== Awards ==
Glicksberg received several awards for "best essay" from the Arizona Quarterly and received various honors in his multiple professorships. He also was awarded a Fulbright Scholarship.

== Literary criticism ==
Glicksberg wrote on a variety of topics, but especially some of his later books like The Ironic Vision in Modern Literature focused on the progression from more heroic tales to more ironic tales as writing approaches the modern day.
