= Daniel Mark Epstein =

American writer (born 1948)

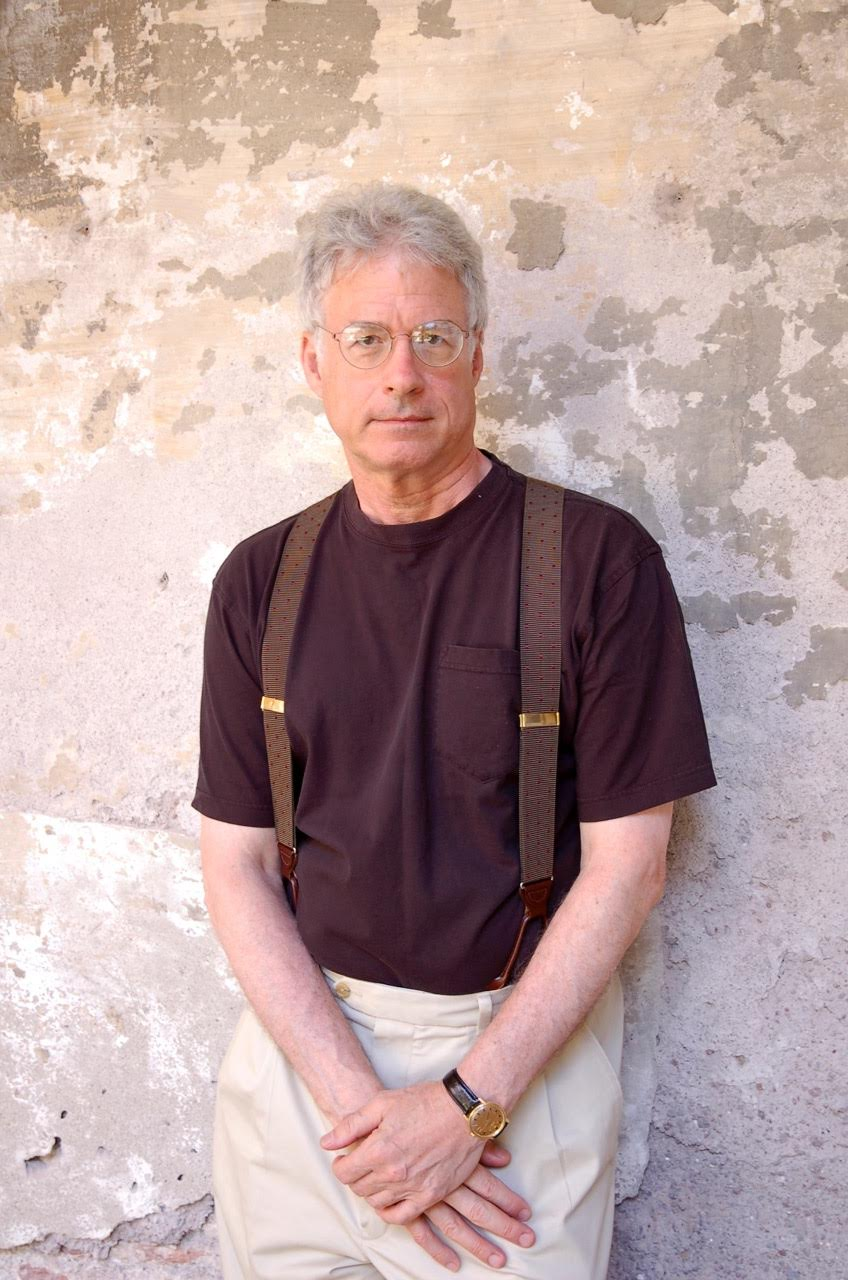
- Born: October 25, 1948 (age 77); Washington, D.C., United States
- Occupations: Poet; playwright; biographer
- Children: 4

Daniel Mark Epstein (born October 25, 1948) is an American poet, dramatist, and biographer. His poetry has been noted for its erotic and spiritual lyricism, as well as its power—in several dramatic monologues—in capturing crucial moments of American history. While he has continued to publish poetry, he is more widely known for his biographies of Nat King Cole, Edna St. Vincent Millay, Bob Dylan and Abraham Lincoln, and his radio plays, "Star of Wonder," and "The Two Menorahs," which have become holiday mainstays on National Public Radio.

== Early life ==
Daniel Mark Epstein was born in Washington D.C., the son of businessman Donald David Epstein, and Louise Tillman, a homemaker. His younger sister is the journalist Linda Stevens. Epstein grew up in West Hyattsville, Maryland, suburban Washington, and his mother's home town of Vienna on the Eastern Shore of Maryland. Many of his poems, plays, and short stories are inspired by life in Dorchester County and Vienna in the mid-twentieth century. He began writing poetry when he was in grade school. Some poems he wrote in his early teens came to the attention of Elliot Coleman, the founder of the Writing Seminars at Johns Hopkins University. Coleman invited him to Baltimore and offered advice and encouragement. Epstein was educated in the public schools of Prince George's County and at Kenyon College, where he worked with poet John Crowe Ransom, graduating with Highest Honors in English in 1970. He briefly attended graduate school at the University of Virginia with the support of a Woodrow Wilson and Danforth Foundation grant, but he left after a semester to pursue a career as a writer.

== 1970s ==
Epstein quickly established his reputation as a poet in the early 1970s by publishing poems in The New Yorker, The Nation, The Kenyon Review, and other prominent journals. These were collected in the volume No Vacancies in Hell, published by Liveright in 1973. The success of this first book, a second book of poems titled The Follies, and his verse drama Jenny and the Phoenix, produced at the Baltimore Theatre Project in 1977, drew the attention of the American Academy of Arts and Letters. They awarded Epstein the Prix de Rome (Rome Prize) that year.

During his fellowship at the American Academy in Rome he wrote more verse drama as well as many of the poems that would be included in The Book of Fortune, published in 1982. While Epstein was still in Italy his third book, Young Men's Gold, was published to wide acclaim, one critic calling the title poem "quite possibly the best long poem since Ginsberg's 'Howl' " and the reviewer from The New Republic comparing the love poems to those of John Donne. He returned to America in 1979 as one of the most widely read poets of his generation. He was soon under contract to the Keedick agency for a speaking tour, with Oxford University Press to translate Euripides, and accepted a position as visiting Assistant Professor at Johns Hopkins University. Jenny and the Phoenix was optioned by Joseph Papp for production at The Public Theater in New York. In Baltimore he became active in a vibrant poetry scene that included such poets as Lucille Clifton, Anselm Hollo, Andrei Codrescu, and David Franks.

== 1980s ==
Epstein taught poetry and playwriting at the Johns Hopkins Seminars until 1982. While he continued teaching part time, at Randolph Macon, Towson State University, and The Maryland College Institute of Art, his ongoing work in the theatre and a contract to write a textbook for D.C. Heath made an academic career impractical. The failure of Epstein's Off-Broadway play The Midnight Visitor in 1981 darkened his prospects as a playwright. In the mid-eighties he began publishing prose essays and short stories that were popularly syndicated and anthologized. The first of these, "Star of Wonder", about a boy whose parents insist upon celebrating both Hanukah and Christmas inspired hundreds of passionate letters in a dozen city newspapers when it first appeared in syndication. Later broadcast yearly on NPR's All Things Considered, it became one of the best known holiday stories since "A Christmas Carol".

"Star of Wonder" is the title story of a collection of holiday tales published in 1986. On the strength of that book the author secured a two-book contract with Addison and Wesley: To Write an Autobiography, Love's Compass, and a biography of the evangelist Aimee Semple McPherson, Sister Aimee. The publication of these books, the first in 1990 and the second in 1993, offered the poet a chance at a second career, as a biographer and historian.

== 1990s ==
While much of Epstein's best poetry was published in the 1980s and 1990s (Spirits, The Boy in the Well) his poetry has been eclipsed by the success of the biographies of Sister Aimee, Nat King Cole, and Edna St. Vincent Millay. Epstein was welcomed as a sympathetic and fair biographer, with an instinct for the fine detail and historical milieu; his biography of Millay was praised as "less catty, more adoring, more literary and generous" than another biographer's." Critics sometimes challenge the biographer's premises. Eric Foner, in The Washington Post, praised Lincoln and Whitman for its "revealing character study of Whitman and a penetrating analysis of his wartime poetry," but questioned the poet's influence on Lincoln's prose. These books were all reviewed in the major media—the Nat King Cole biography on the cover of The New York Times Book Review—and have remained in print through multiple editions. During this decade, as in the 1980s, Epstein contributed book reviews to The New York Times, The Wall Street Journal, The Philadelphia Inquirer, and other newspapers. He also published translations of Plautus's Trinummus from the Latin, and Euripides' The Bacchae from the Greek.

== 2000–2010 ==
Most of this period was devoted to the writing of a trilogy of books about Abraham Lincoln. Lincoln and Whitman (2004), about the president and the poet, was praised by The New Yorker and The Wall Street Journal for its "natural sense of detail and period" and its "passionate vividness," although Eric Foner in The Washington Post wrote, "The book's treatment of its two protagonists' lives is too episodic to qualify as dual biography," and The Lincolns: Portrait of a Marriage (2008) was named one of the ten best books of the year by the Chicago Sun Times and The Wall Street Journal, whose reviewer remarked it "may be the best Lincoln book in a generation." Epstein's short book on Lincoln's private secretaries, Lincoln's Men, was published the following year.

== 2011–present ==
An amateur musician, the writer returned to the subject of music, and his life-long passion for folk music in particular, to write the biography of Bob Dylan on the occasion of the folk rock idol's seventieth birthday. Published in 2011 it was the first of Epstein's books to reach an extensive international audience, in editions published in English, French, Italian, Portuguese, and other languages.

For many years Epstein was researching and writing a book about Benjamin Franklin's relationship with his son William, the last royal governor of New Jersey. The Loyal Son: The War in Ben Franklin's House (Ballantine/Random House) was finally published in 2018. The reviewer in the Wall Street Journal wrote that “The history of loyalist William Franklin and his famous father has been told before but not as fully or as well as it is by Daniel Mark Epstein in The Loyal Son. Mr. Epstein, a biographer and poet, has done a lot of fresh research and invests his narrative with literary grace and judicious sympathy for both father and son. . . . " In a starred review in Kirkus, the critic said: “A gripping history of a family torn apart by political upheaval . . . Drawing on much unpublished correspondence as well as published works, the author constructs a fast-paced, vivid narrative with a host of characters whose appearance and personality he etches with deft concision. . . . A perceptive, gritty portrayal of the frenzy of war and a father and son caught at its tumultuous center.”

Dawn to Twilight: New and Selected Poems 1967-2014 was published by Louisiana State University Press in 2015. The book achieved international acclaim when it was published in Italy as Dall'alba al crepuscolo (Raffaelli Editore, Rimini, 2020) translated by Simone Dubrovic. The critic in Italy's most prominent newspaper Corriere della Sera, Daniele Piccini wrote: "The art of American poet Daniel Mark Epstein was born mature.... The crystalline voice of things that arises out of his verses--always chiselled and metrically refined--becomes one with the poet's reflection on the fate of human beings." The Italian translation of “Water Lillies,” from Epstein's sequence “Homage to Mallarme,” inspired the harp sonata “Le Ninfee,” by Harpist Emanuela Battigelli. The new work was recorded on Battigelli’s CD Le Ninfee (Artesuono, 2020).

In April 2020 Epstein composed a cycle of sonnets "written in ten days from April 5–15, during the first shelter-in-place orders of the coronavirus pandemic...that explore the themes of isolation, danger, and the strangeness of our new reality," in his own words. The poems became the text for a film titled Cruel April: Poems from the Pandemic, directed by Douglas Trapp and starring actors Tyne Daly, Jennifer Van Dyck, Paul Hecht, and Harris Yulin. The actors recite the poems over a montage of art and photography from the Tivoli Gallery, New York.

In March 2022 Yale University Press published Rapture and Melancholy, Epstein's edition of Edna St. Vincent Millay's diaries with an introduction and extensive commentary. "Seven decades after Millay's death," said the New York Times, Rapture and Melancholy paints a picture of artistic triumph, romantic tumult, and a daily life that descended into addiction." Abigail Deutch, writing in the Wall Street Journal, wrote: “Rapture and Melancholy... provides an occasion to revisit not just Millay's improbable life but also her sometimes revelatory work. . . . While the diary entries vary widely in interest level, Epstein’s biographical summations are reliably fascinating and informative. . . . "

In 1984, in an interview with Mara Meisel of the Pittsburgh Press, Epstein said, "I always had confidence that poetry was the most important thing in my life.... No great poet has not had an extraordinary command of the language, all of history and the manners and morals of his age. How are you going to say something that's going to be significant to people if you aren't well-grounded in history and in a broad sense of human nature?" In April 2022 the poet received an Honorary Doctorate of Letters degree from Kenyon College.

== Personal life ==
In 1976, Epstein married Wendy Roberts. They had two children and were divorced in 1993. In 1993, Epstein married Jennifer Bishop. They had two sons and were divorced in 2012. Since the early 1970s Epstein has been a member of B'nai Israel Synagogue in Baltimore.

== Books ==
- No Vacancies In Hell (poetry) Liveright/Norton, 1973
- The Follies (poetry) Overlook/Viking Press, 1977
- Young Men's Gold (poetry) Overlook/Viking Press, 1978
- The Book of Fortune (poetry) Overlook/Viking Press, 1982
- Star of Wonder (stories and essays) Overlook/Viking 1986
- Spirits (poetry) Overlook/Viking 1987
- Love's Compass (essays) Addison-Wesley, 1989
- Sister Aimee: the Life of Aimee Semple McPherson, Harcourt Brace, 1993
- The Trinummus of Plautus (translation) Johns Hopkins University Press, 1994
- The Boy in the Well (poetry) Overlook/Viking, 1995
- The Bacchae of Euripides (translation) University of Pennsylvania Press, 1997
- Nat King Cole (biography) Farrar, Straus and Giroux, 1999
- What Lips My Lips Have Kissed: Life of Edna St. Vincent Millay Holt, 2001
- The Traveler's Calendar (poetry) Overlook/Penguin Putnam, 2002
- Lincoln and Whitman: Parallel Lives in Civil War Washington, Random House, 2004
- The Lincolns: Portrait of a Marriage, Ballantine/Random House, 2004
- Literary Genius: 25 Classic Writers Who Define English & American Literature, Paul Dry Books, 2007 (Illustrated by Barry Moser)
- The Glass House: New Poems, LSU Press, 2009
- Lincoln's Men: The President and His Private Secretaries, HarperCollins, 2009
- The Ballad of Bob Dylan, Harper, 2011
- Dawn to Twilight: New and Selected Poems, Louisiana State University Press, 2015
- The Loyal Son: The War in Ben Franklin's House, Ballantine/Random House, 2018
- Rapture and Melancholy: The Diaries of Edna St. Vincent Millay, Yale University Press, 2022

== Fellowships ==
- Woodrow Wilson Fellowship (Individual Study Grant), 1971
- Danforth Fellowship, University of Virginia, 1971
- National Endowment for the Arts, Fellowship in Poetry, 1974
- Guggenheim Fellowship, 1984
- Richard L. Thomas Chair in Creative Writing, Kenyon College, 2012
- Patrick Henry Fellowship, 2014

== Awards ==
- Prix de Rome, The American Academy and National Institute of Arts and Letters, 1978
- Emily Clark Balch Award, for best poem of 1981, from The Virginia Quarterly, 1981
- The New York Times Notable Book, for Nat King Cole, 1999
- New York Public Library Honoree, "Books to Remember" for What Lips My Lips Have Kissed, 2001
- Maryland Library Association's Author of the Year, 2002
- Academy Award for Lifetime Achievement, American Academy of Arts and Letters, 2006
