= Passage to India (Whitman) =

1871 Walt Whitman poetry collection

Passage to India is a poetry collection published by Walt Whitman in 1871. The first edition was 120 pages long and held seventy-four poems, including twenty-three or twenty-four first published in the collection. Whitman likely intended the work as a supplementary volume to his collection Leaves of Grass and included it as part of some copies of that year's edition of Leaves of Grass. The following year all of the supplement was included as part of Leaves of Grass, but it was a separate volume for the 1876 edition and the supplement Two Rivulets was instead included as part of Leaves of Grass. In the 1881 Leaves of Grass both the poems contained in Passage to India and Two Rivulets were distributed throughout Leaves of Grass.

The poetry collection's title poem, "Passage to India", was Whitman's last major poem. Whitman wrote it in 1869 after the Suez Canal was first opened. E. M. Forster titled A Passage to India, a 1924 novel, after the poem.

== Bibliography ==
- Whitman, Walt (2008). Bradley, Sculley; Blodgett, Harold W.; Golden, Arthur; White, William (eds.). Leaves of Grass: A Textual Variorum of the Printed Poems, 1855-1856. NYU Press. ISBN 978-0-8147-9442-5.
