= Dooryard Bloom =

Music by Jennifer Higdon

Dooryard Bloom is a composition for solo baritone and orchestra by the American composer Jennifer Higdon. The work was commissioned by the Brooklyn Philharmonic in 2004 and was premiered on April 16, 2005, by the baritone Nmon Ford and the Brooklyn Philharmonic under the conductor Michael Christie. The piece is adapted from the poem "When Lilacs Last in the Dooryard Bloom'd" by the American author Walt Whitman.

== Composition ==
=== Background ===
Dooryard Bloom has a duration of roughly 23 minutes. The music was set to text adapted from Walt Whitman's poem "When Lilacs Last in the Dooryard Bloom'd", a process Higdon described in the score program notes as "a near impossible task". Higdon further explained:

Normally, for a composer, the explanation of a piece is a much more straightforward affair. In this particular case, it is extremely difficult, maybe not even possible, for the text discusses and explores so many aspects of grief and loss. As a composer, I am hesitant to tread in this area with words (because Whitman did it so masterfully); I feel that only the musical notes that I write can do so in an appropriate manner. I can tell you, however, that I was moved by all of the stages of grief that Whitman examines in this poem, and that I was struck by the fact that he captures the extreme range of emotions that we all must face at some point. My title, Dooryard Bloom is a play of words on Whitman's title. A dooryard is defined as the yard next to the door of a house... which in this poem could mean many things... is the yard the hereafter? Or is it a place leading to a passage? What is the bloom? The growth of a flower or a view of light? The lilacs blooming... are they representative of death or of life? Or of growth? Or of time passing... lilacs last. The beauty of music is the power to suggest things that even words might not convey. Therefore, take your own meaning from this piece, literally or emotionally or metaphorically... let it be your own dooryard.

Whitman's poem had also famously been adapted to music by composer Paul Hindemith for his 1946 requiem When Lilacs Last in the Dooryard Bloom'd: A Requiem for those we love.

=== Instrumentation ===
The work is scored for solo baritone and an orchestra comprising two flutes, two oboes (2nd doubling English horn), two clarinets, two bassoons, two French horns, two trumpets, harp, two percussionists, and strings.

== Reception ==
Reviewing the world premiere, Allan Kozinn of The New York Times called Dooryard Bloom "a substantial new score" and praised Higdon's vocal and orchestra writing. Kozinn added, "Most crucially, though, her setting matches and magnifies the charged emotional arc of Whitman's text, with its inexorable passion, its submerged anger and the peaceful acceptance of its final lines." The music critic Steve Smith praised the piece as Higdon's "most trenchant work and among her loveliest." David Patrick Stearns of The Philadelphia Inquirer called it "a thoroughly attractive piece," but added:

Higdon maintained respectful but not impersonal distance from the words with near-conversational vocal lines, almost like a poetry reading with bits of tunes. That could have seemed glib were there not so much picturesque writing in the orchestra, which was often divided into chamber ensembles of unusual combinations, like a trio consisting of oboe, vibraphone and harp. There were also contrasting, simultaneous keys, as if Higdon were creating a mural of Whitman's inner world with its density of not necessarily congruent events.

== See also ==
- List of compositions by Jennifer Higdon
