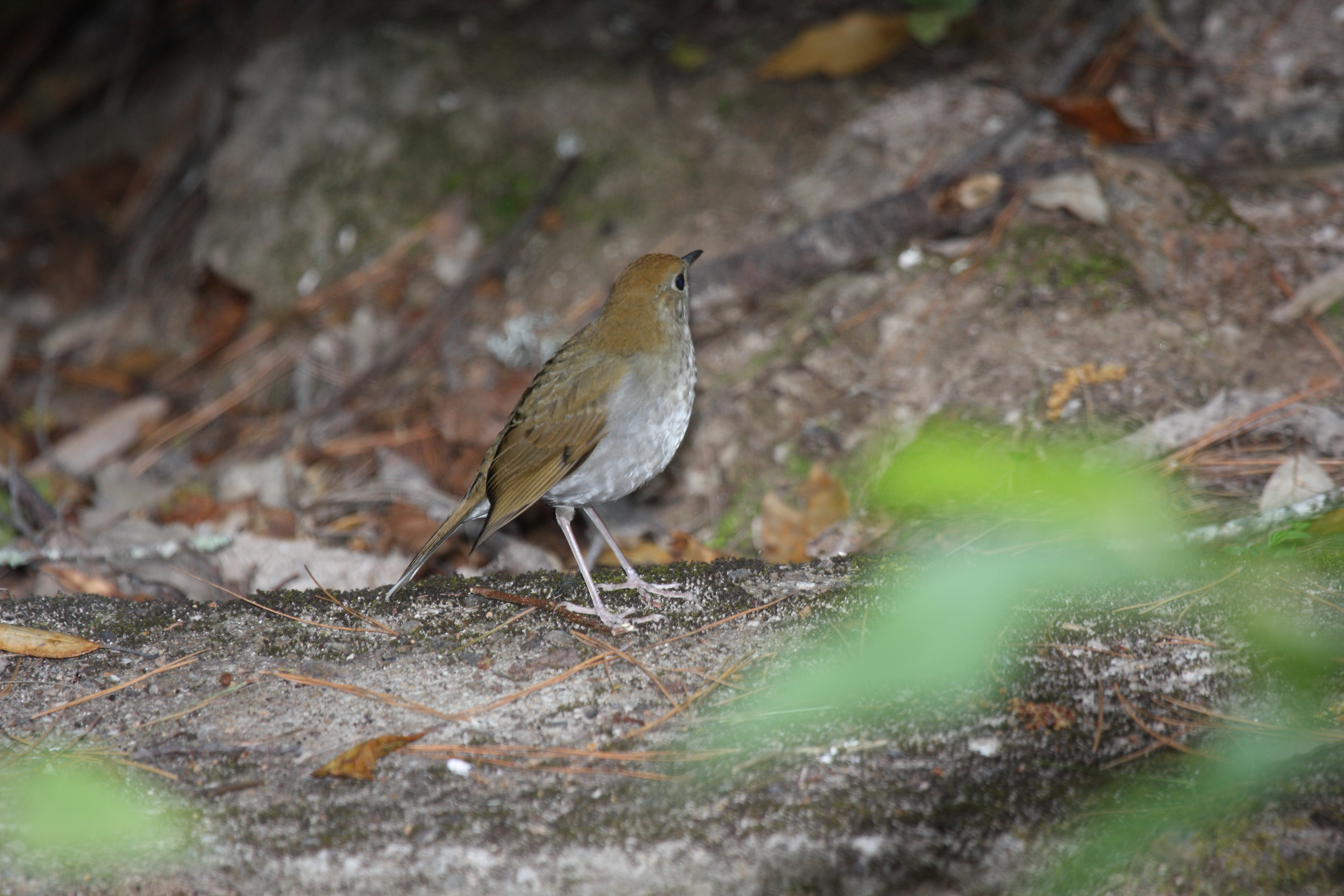
- olivascens subspecies

Conservation status
- Least Concern (IUCN 3.1)

Scientific classification
- Kingdom: Animalia
- Phylum: Chordata
- Class: Aves
- Order: Passeriformes
- Family: Turdidae
- Genus: Catharus
- Species: C. occidentalis

Binomial name
- Catharus occidentalis Sclater, PL, 1859

= Russet nightingale-thrush =

Species of bird

The russet nightingale-thrush (Catharus occidentalis) is a species of bird in the family Turdidae, the thrushes and allies. It is endemic to Mexico.

== Taxonomy and systematics ==
The russet nightingale-thrush was originally described in 1859 with its current binomial Catharus occidentalis. It and the hermit thrush (Catharus guttatus) of temperate North America are sister species.

The russet nightingale-thrush has these four subspecies:

- C. o. olivascens Nelson, 1899
- C. o. lambi Phillips, AR, 1969
- C. o. fulvescens Nelson, 1897
- C. o. occidentalis Sclater, PL, 1859

What is now the ruddy-capped nightingale-thrush (C. frantzii) was originally described as a species but for much of the twentieth century was treated as a subspecies of the russet nightingale-thrush.

== Description ==
The russet nightingale-thrush is 15.5 to 18 cm (6.1 to 7.1 in) long and weighs 22 to 37 g (0.78 to 1.3 oz). The sexes have the same plumage. Adults of the nominate subspecies C. o. occidentalis have a deep russet brown crown and nape and a light olive brown or buffy olive face. Their upperparts are mostly a more olivaceous russet brown than the crown but the uppertail coverts and tail are more rufescent than the back. Their wings are mostly colored like the back but have buffy at the base of the flight feathers' inner webs. Their chin and throat are buffy whitish, grayish white, or pale buff and the throat usually has faint grayish brown or olive streaks. Their breast is pale buffy olive with indistinct darker streaks or spots. Their flanks are pale grayish olive. Immature birds have russet or rufescent brown crown and upperparts with light tawny streaks or spots. Their underparts are mostly pale buffy with olive or olive brown feather tips.

Subspecies C. o. olivascens has olive brown upperparts without russet. Its throat and breast are a deeper buff than the nominate's and have heavier gray streaks. The center of its belly is pure white. C. o. lambi is similar to olivascens but slightly darker with a redder brown crown and smaller markings on the breast. C. o. fulvescens has a lighter rufous crown, lighter and more fulvous upperparts, and much lighter underparts than the nominate. All subspecies have a brown iris, a dark brown or blackish maxilla, a dusky-tipped yellowish mandible, and pale pink legs and feet.

== Distribution and habitat ==
The russet nightingale-thrush has a disjunct distribution. The subspecies are found thus:

- C. o. olivascens: northwestern Mexico from southeastern Sonora and western Chihuahua south to northern Sinaloa and northwestern Durango
- C. o. lambi: central Mexico from Durango south to northwestern Jalisco and from southeastern Coahuila south to northwestern Puebla
- C. o. fulvescens: southwestern Mexico from southern Jalisco east to Puebla and south to Guerrero
- C. o. occidentalis: southern Mexico in western Guerrero and Oaxaca

The russet nightingale-thrush inhabits montane evergreen, pine-oak, and oak forest in the subtropical and lower temperate zones. In elevation it ranges between 1,500 and 3,700 m (4,900 and 12,100 ft).

== Behavior ==
=== Movement ===
The russet nightingale-thrush is primarily a year-round resident though some elevational or seasonal movements have been observed.

=== Feeding ===
The russet nightingale-thrush's diet is primarily insects with some fruit, but details are lacking. It usually forages singly, on the ground or near it in the forest's understory.

=== Breeding ===
The russet nightingale-thrush's breeding season has not been fully defined but spans at least April to July in the southern part of its range. It builds a cup nest near or on the ground. The clutch is two or three eggs that are plain blue. The incubation period, time to fledging, and details of parental care are not known.

=== Vocalization ===
The russet nightingale-thrush's song is "varied, thin phrases with [a] tinny quality, [a] not particularly musical she-vee-ee-i-lu or chee ti-vee, etc." that is sometimes repeated in fairly rapid succession. Its calls include "a quiet, low, slightly gruff chuk or chruh, and a nasal, mewing reear".

== Status ==
The IUCN has assessed the russet nightingale-thrush as being of Least Concern. It has a large range; its population size is not known and is believed to be decreasing. No immediate threats have been identified. It is considered fairly common to common.
