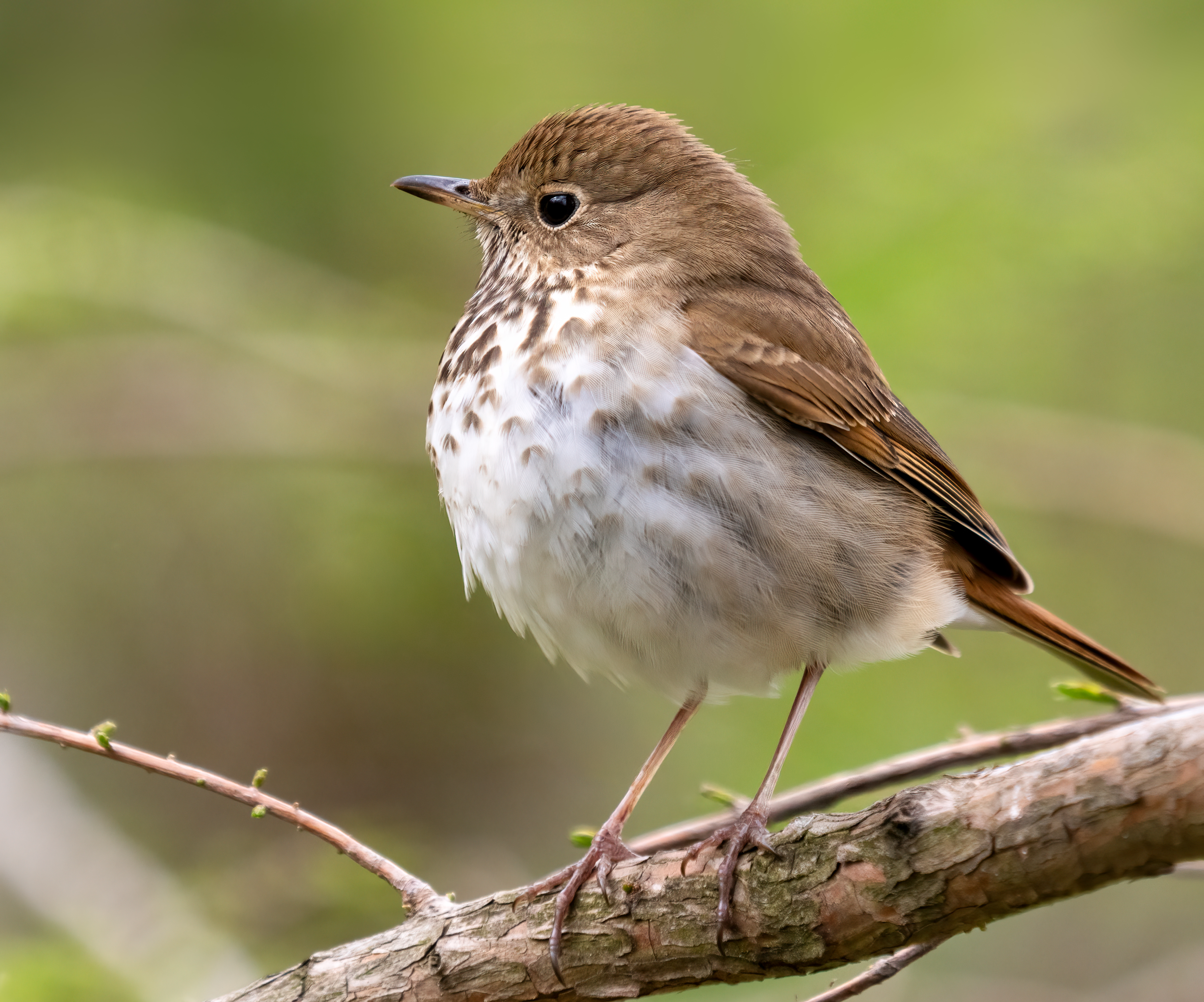
- Song Call

Conservation status
- Least Concern (IUCN 3.1)

Scientific classification
- Kingdom: Animalia
- Phylum: Chordata
- Class: Aves
- Order: Passeriformes
- Family: Turdidae
- Genus: Catharus
- Species: C. guttatus

Binomial name
- Catharus guttatus (Pallas, 1811)
- Breeding Migration Year-round Nonbreeding

Synonyms
- List: Turdus aonalaschkae Gmelin, 1789 (Unav.); Muscicapa guttata Pallas, 1811; Turdus guttatus (Pallas, 1811); Hylocichla guttata (Pallas, 1811); Hylocichla guttata guttata (Pallas, 1811); Catharus guttatus (Pallas, 1811); Catharus guttatus guttatus (Pallas, 1811); Turdus nanus Audubon, 1839; Turdus pallasii nanus (Audubon, 1839); Turdus pallasi var. nanus (Audubon, 1839); Hylocichla guttata nana (Audubon, 1839); Hylocichla guttata nanus (Audubon, 1839); Catharus guttatus nanus (Audubon, 1839); Turdus pallasii Cabanis, 1847; Turdus aonalaschkae pallasii (Cabanis, 1847); Hylocichla guttata pallasii (Cabanis, 1847); Turdus silens Sclater, 1859; Turdus auduboni Baird, 1864; Turdus pallasii auduboni (Baird, 1864); Turdus pallasi var. auduboni (Baird, 1864); Turdus aonalaschkae auduboni (Baird, 1864); Hylocichla guttata auduboni (Baird, 1864); Catharus guttatus auduboni (Baird, 1864); Turdus audubonii Ridgway, 1869 (Missp.); Turdus pallasi Ridgway, 1869 (Missp.); Turdus aonalaschkae pallasi (Ridgway, 1869)(Missp.); Hylocichla guttata pallasi (Ridgway, 1869)(Missp.); Turdus sequoiensis Belding, 1889; Hylocichla guttata sequoiensis (Belding, 1889); Hylocichla aonalaschkae sequoiensis (Belding, 1889); Catharus guttatus sequoiensis (Belding, 1889); Hylocichla aonalaschkae verecunda Osgood, 1901; Catharus guttatus verecundus (Osgood, 1901); Hylocichla aonalaschkae slevini Grinnell, 1902; Hylocichla guttata slevini (Grinnell, 1902); Catharus guttatus slevini (Grinnell, 1902); Hylocichla guttata polionota Grinnell, 1918; Catharus guttatus polionotus (Grinnell, 1918); Hylocichla guttata faxoni Bangs & Penard, 1921; Catharus guttatus faxoni (Bangs & Penard, 1921); Hylocichla guttata vaccinia Cumming, 1933; Catharus guttatus vaccinius (Cumming, 1933); Hylocichla guttata crymophila Burleigh & Peters, 1948; Catharus guttatus crymophilus (Burleigh & Peters, 1948); Hylocichla guttata euboria Oberholser, 1956; Catharus guttatus euborius (Oberholser, 1956); Catharus guttatus jewetti Phillips, 1962; Catharus guttatus munroi Phillips, 1962; Catharus guttatus oromelus Phillips, 1962; Catharus guttatus osgoodi Phillips, 1991

= Hermit thrush =

Species of bird

The hermit thrush (Catharus guttatus) is a medium-sized North American thrush.

== Taxonomy ==
It is not very closely related to the other North American migrant species of Catharus, but rather to the Mexican russet nightingale-thrush. The specific name guttatus is Latin for "spotted", though historically this species has been given 17 additional species or subspecies names by various authors, now all treated as synonyms.

== Description ==
This species measures 15 to 18 cm (5.9 to 7.1 in) in length, spans 25 to 30 cm (9.8 to 11.8 in) across the wings and weighs 18 to 37 g (0.63 to 1.31 oz). Among standard measurements, the wing chord is 7.8 to 11.1 cm (3.1 to 4.4 in), the bill is 1.6 to 1.9 cm (0.63 to 0.75 in) and the tarsus is 2.7 to 3.3 cm (1.1 to 1.3 in). It is more compact and stockier than other North American Catharus thrushes, with relatively longer wings. The hermit thrush has the white-dark-white underwing pattern characteristic of Catharus thrushes. Adults are mainly brown on the upperparts, with reddish tails. The underparts are white with dark spots on the breast and grey or brownish flanks. They have pink legs and a white eye ring. Birds in the east are more olive-brown on the upperparts; western birds are more grey-brown.

== Distribution and habitat ==
Hermit thrushes breed in coniferous or mixed woods across Canada, southern Alaska, and the northeastern and western United States. They are very rare vagrants to western Europe and northeast Asia.

While most hermit thrushes migrate to wintering grounds in the southern United States and south to Central America, some remain in northern coastal US states and southern Ontario. Identification of spotted thrushes is simplified by the fact that hermit thrush is the only spotted thrush normally found in North America during winter.

== Breeding ==
Hermit thrushes make a cup nest on the ground or relatively low in a tree. They usually breed in forests, but will sometimes winter in parks and wooded suburban neighborhoods.

== Behavior ==
Hermit thrushes forage on the forest floor, as well as in trees or shrubs, mainly eating insects and berries.

== Song ==
The hermit thrush's song has been described as "the finest sound in nature" and is ethereal and flute-like, consisting of a beginning note, then several descending musical phrases in a minor key, repeated at different pitches. It often sings from a high open location. Analysis of the notes of its song indicates that they are related by harmonic simple integer pitch ratios, like many kinds of human music and unlike the songs of other birds that have been similarly examined.

== In culture ==
The hermit thrush is the state bird of Vermont.

Walt Whitman construes the hermit thrush as a symbol of the American voice, poetic and otherwise, in his elegy for Abraham Lincoln, "When Lilacs Last in the Dooryard Bloom'd," one of the fundamental texts in the American literary canon. "A Hermit Thrush" is the name of a poem by the American poet Amy Clampitt. A hermit thrush appears in the fifth section ("What the Thunder Said") of the T. S. Eliot poem The Waste Land.

Former Canadian indie-rock band Thrush Hermit took their name from a reversal of the bird's name. It is also shared by the American bands Hermit Thrushes and Hermit Thrush.

== Gallery ==
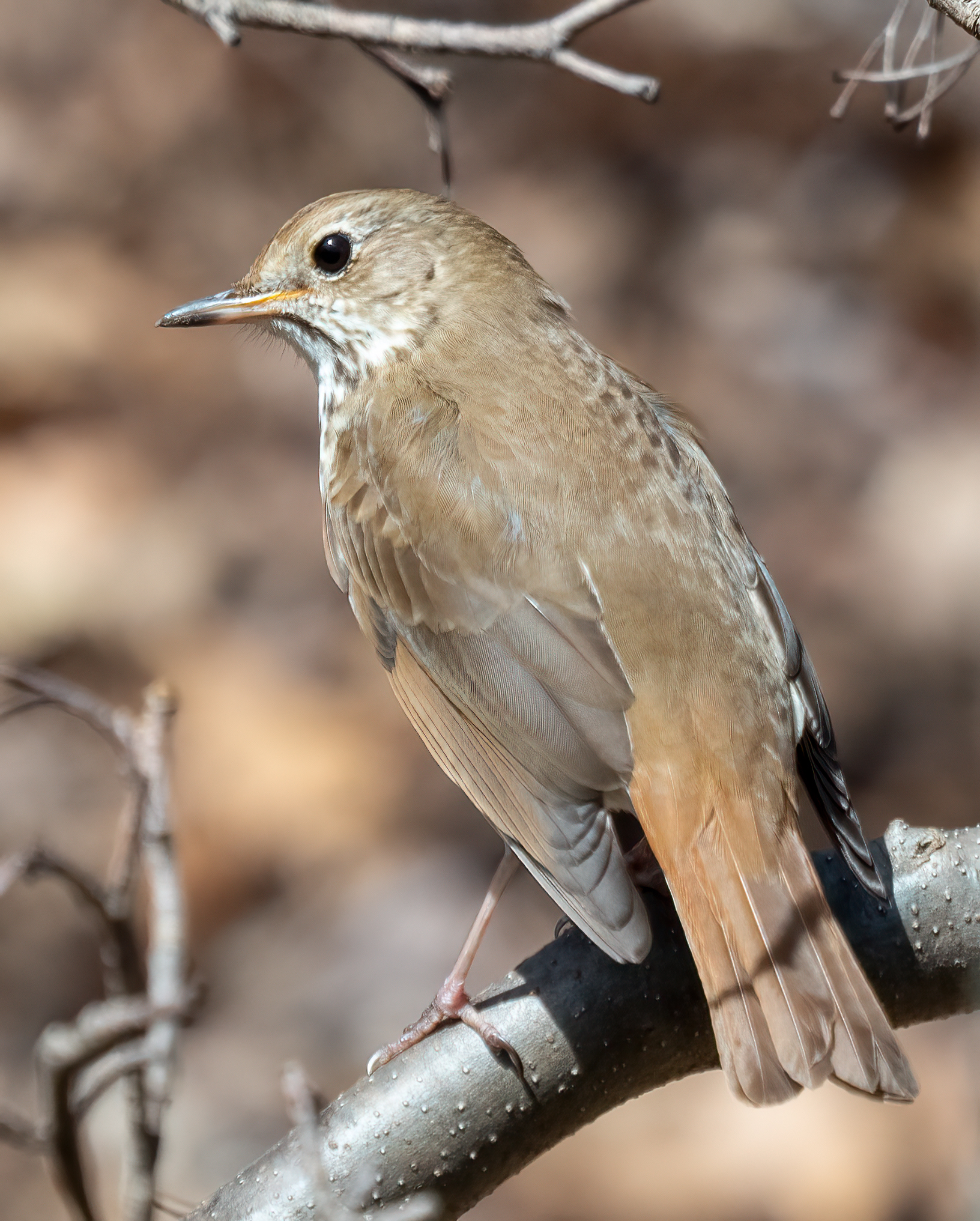
Adult in New York City, showing reddish tail

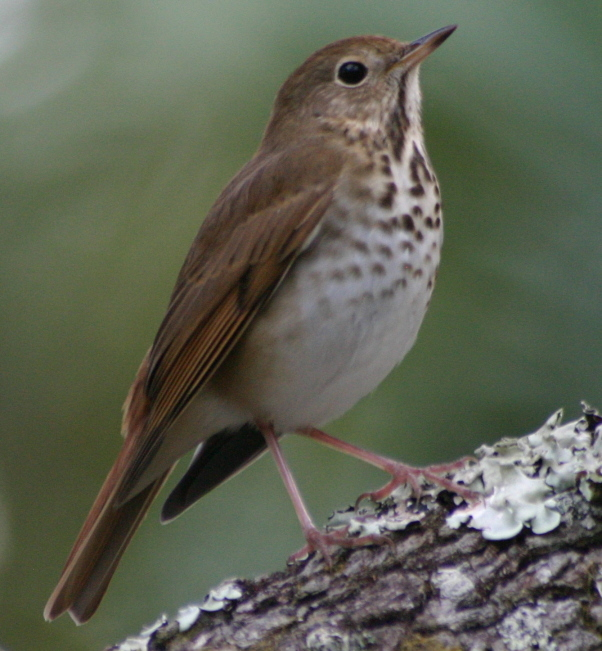
Ocala National Forest, Florida 2008

Hermit thrush singing

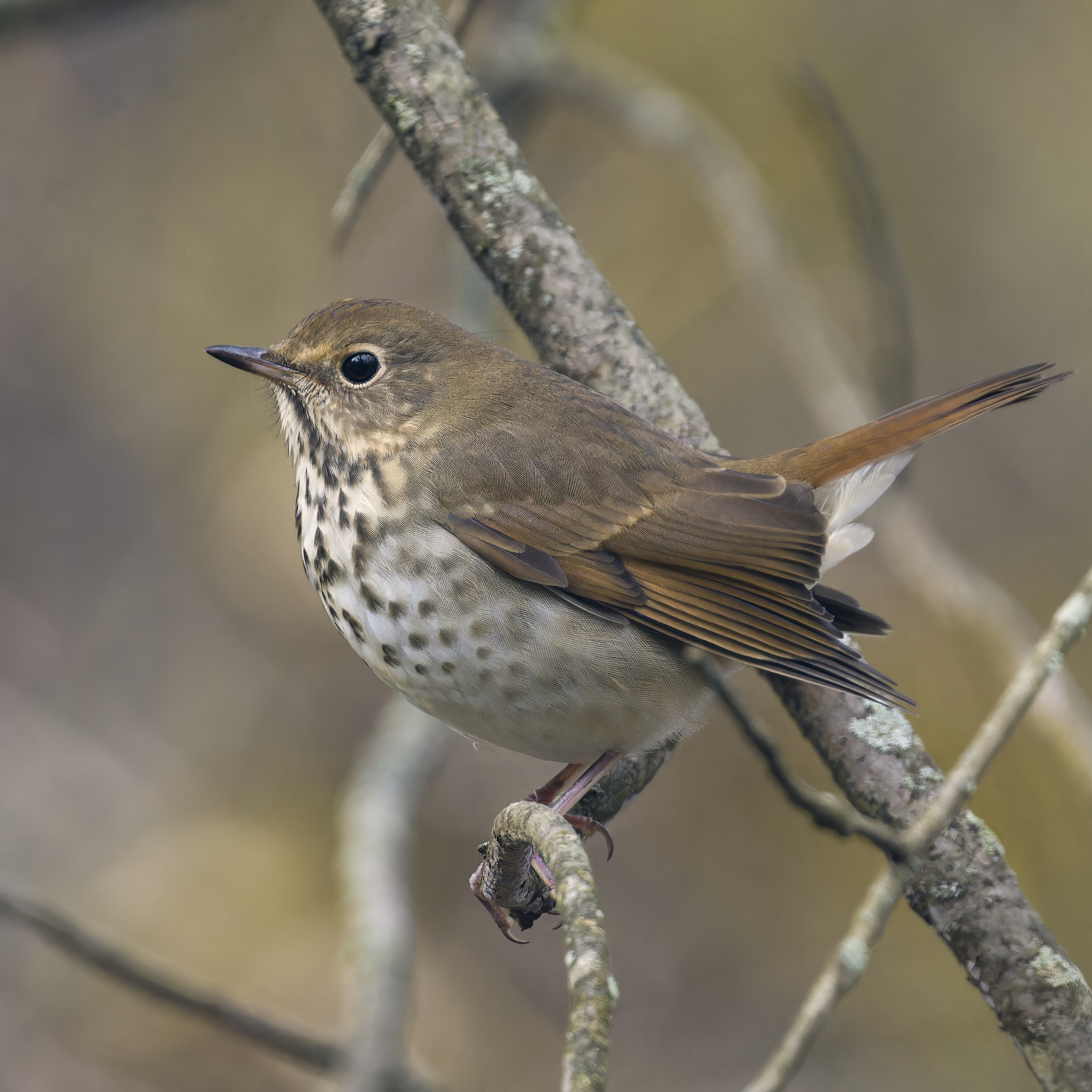
East Hartford, Connecticut
