= Pastoral elegy =

Type of poem

The pastoral elegy is a poem about both death and idyllic rural life. Often, the pastoral elegy features shepherds. The genre is actually a subgroup of pastoral poetry, as the elegy takes the pastoral elements and relates them to expressing grief at a loss. This form of poetry has several key features, including the invocation of the Muse, expression of the shepherd's, or poet's, grief, praise of the deceased, a tirade against death, a detailing of the effects of this specific death upon nature, and eventually, the poet's simultaneous acceptance of death's inevitability and hope for immortality. Additional features sometimes found within pastoral elegies include a procession of mourners, satirical digressions about different topics stemming from the death, and symbolism through flowers, refrains, and rhetorical questions. The pastoral elegy is typically incredibly moving and in its most classic form, it concerns itself with simple, country figures. In ordinary pastoral poems, the shepherd is the poem's main character. In pastoral elegies, the deceased is often recast as a shepherd, despite what his role may have been in life. Further, after being recast as a shepherd, the deceased is often surrounded by classical mythology figures, such as nymphs, fauns, etc. Pastoral elegy is one of the forms of poems in Elizabethan poetry.

== Explanation of the elegy ==
An elegy is a meditative lyric poem that has a very mournful and melancholy tone. It is usually written to mourn the death of a close friend or loved one, but also occasionally mourns humanity as a whole. Although this form of poetry reflects on the notion of death, it is not to be confused with a “eulogy,” which is a speech that gives tribute to a person, usually after the person has died.

Originally, in Greek and Roman poetry, an elegy was a poem written in elegiac verse, which included couplets consisting of a hexameter line followed by a pentameter line. A hexameter line contains six metrical feet while a pentameter line contains five metrical feet. Dating back to the 7th century BC, the elegy was used to write about various topics, including love, lamentation, and politics. This form of poetry was widely used by poets such as Archilochus, Mimnermus, Tytraeus, Catullus, and Ovid.

In English literature, it was not until the 16th century that the term “elegy” began to refer to the content of the poem as opposed to the metrical form of the poem. Since then, the term elegy usually refers to a meditative poem of lamentation with no set metrical form. Examples of modern elegies include Walt Whitman's "When Lilacs Last in the Dooryard Bloom'd,” which reflects on the death of Abraham Lincoln, and Thomas Gray's "Elegy Written in a Country Churchyard", which mourns humanity as a whole. Other examples include E. E, Cummings’ My Father Moved Through Dooms Of Love, John Peale Bishop's “Hours,” A E Housman's "To an Athlete Dying Young", and W. H. Auden's “In Memory of W.B. Yeats."

== Explanation of Pastoral poetry ==
Pastoral poetry is a genre that typically relates to country/rural life and often depicts the lives of shepherds. This sort of poetry describes the simple and pure lives of shepherds, who exist free from the corruptions of city life. Rural life is depicted as being “pure” in pastoral poetry and is usually idealized. The most common themes that are written about in pastoral poetry are love and death, although religion, politics, and other social issues are common as well. Often, the poet and his friends are represented by the characters in the poem. Through these characters, the poet expresses his or her own social, moral, political, and literary views.

Pastoral poetry was first introduced by the Greek poet Theocritus in his Idylls. Set in the countryside, his poems reflect on folk traditions and involve dialogue between shepherds. This style of poetry was later adapted by the Roman poet Virgil, who frequently set his poems in Arcadia. Over time, the genre was adapted by a variety of different poets to include various themes, including romance, drama, courtship, seduction, and death. One of the most popular subgroups of pastoral poetry is the elegy, in which the poet mourns the death of a friend, often a fellow shepherd.

Eventually, pastoral poetry became popular among English poets, especially through Edmund Spenser's “The Shepherd’s Calendar,” which was published in 1579. One of the most famous examples of pastoral poetry is John Milton's “Lycidas.” Written in 1637, the poem is written about Edward King, a fellow student of Milton's who had died.

== Historical overview ==
History of pastoral poetry

Pastoral elegy, a subcategory of the elegy form of poetry, has its roots in Hellenistic Greek poetry of the 3rd and 2nd centuries BCE. Pastoral poetry itself, which deals heavily with shepherds and other forms of rustic life, dates back to the 3rd century BC when Theocritus, a Greek poet, wrote his idylls about rustic life in Sicily. The Roman poet Virgil was known for writing poems that depicted his sophisticated colleagues and himself as shepherds in simple, rustic settings. Virgil was also the first poet to set his elegies in Arcadia, a favorite location of pastoral literature to come. Developed over centuries, pastoral elegies mourn a subject by representing the mourner and the subject as shepherds. Shakespeare and his contemporaries were known to imitate some of the conventions of traditional pastoral poetry, and many hundreds of years later, the pastoral elegy was still practiced by 19th-century Romantic and Victorian poets.

History of elegies

In classic literature, an elegy was simply any poem written in elegiac meter and was not restricted by its subject. Elegiac meter was considered alternating lines of dactylic hexameter and pentameter. Most classical elegies were actually love poems, not laments. In English literature since the 16th century CE, the elegy has come to mean specifically a poem of lamentation. Additionally, it may be written in any meter the poet chooses.

Key poets who shaped the genre

After Theocritus' first idyll (early 3rd century BCE), the earliest Greek pastoral elegy is Bion of Smyrna's poem lamenting the death of the mythological figure Adonis. The next earliest example is by an anonymous author, probably of the 1st century BCE, lamenting the death of Bion; this poem has sometimes been attributed to the Hellenistic poet Moschus.

Virgil's "Eclogue 5," written in the 1st century BCE, is the most imitated ancient model of the pastoral elegy. Virgil has two shepherd-poets, Mopsus and Menalcus, commemorate their dead friend and fellow poet Daphnis. Mopsus first laments Daphnis as a godlike figure whose death has caused all of nature to mourn (a pathetic fallacy conventional in pastoral elegies). Mopsus concludes his lament, however, by immortalizing Daphnis with the epitaph “known from here unto the stars” (line 43). Menalcas then describes Daphnis’ deification and nature's rejoicing and praise for Daphnis’ generosity—he is now a tutelary spirit for the pastoral world. Virgil provides hints that Daphnis represents Julius Caesar. Christians also interpreted Daphnis’ death and deification as an allegory of Christ. "Eclogue 5" thus became a model for elegies for public figures and for Christian celebrations of death and resurrection.

Some say the best known elegy in English is "Elegy Written in a Country Churchyard," by Thomas Gray, a well-known English poet. This elegy discusses the actual condition of death, not just the death of a single individual. John Milton’s "Lycidas," considered the most famous pastoral elegy, mourns the death of the poet’s good friend Edward King. In the 17th century, John Donne, a contemporary of Milton’s, explored the genre further and addressed matters of human love, which to his metaphysically inclined mind often resembled death.

In the English language some of the greatest pastoral elegies are "Adonaïs" by Percy Bysshe Shelley, which mourns the death of poet John Keats, and "Thyrsis" by Matthew Arnold, which mourns the poet Arthur Hugh Clough. In 17th century England, Andrew Marvell was a great exponent of the pastoral form, contributing such works as "The Nymph Complaining for the Death of her Faun." In this poem, a nymph or spirit of nature speaks an elegy for her dead pet deer.

The pastoral elegy in contemporary poetry

Pastoral elegy poetry flourished in Europe between the Renaissance and the 19th century. However, modern poets, such as J.V. Cunningham and Alan Dugan, have re-imaged the elegy in both subject and form, and pastoral elegies have recently shown up in more satirical forms. However, other modern poets, such as William Carlos Williams and W. H. Auden, have written poems that maintain the traditional form and features of the pastoral elegy. Andrew Hudgins has an interesting elegy in which he mourns the lonely gap that exists between him and his still-living father.

The poem is considered an elegy in the original sense of the Greek word elegeia, because it laments the fact that the father and son diverge in life, so they will most likely diverge in death as well. Though in its prime, the pastoral elegy had wide appeal, it is now sometimes considered dead.

== Examples of definitive pastoral elegies ==
“Lycidas”

Written by John Milton, "Lycidas" is a pastoral elegy that first appeared in a 1638 collection of elegies in English and Latin entitled Justa Edouardo King Naufrago. Lycidas serves as Milton's commemoration of his Cambridge college mate, Edward King, who drowned when his ship sank off the coast of Wales in August 1637.

In the poem, Milton gives King the name Lycidas, a common name for shepherds in the pastoral poetry of both Theocritus and Virgil. King was both a poet and an aspiring minister, who had died on his way to Ireland to take up a religious posting. Milton uses the shepherd's traditional association with both the poet and the minister to portray the death of King as a grievous waste of poetic and spiritual potential. Milton's persona is the "uncouth swain," a rustic shepherd with lofty poetic aspirations. The poet engages intensely with the pastoral tradition as he works through the crisis King's death evidently posed for him, considering the similarities between Milton and King.

In its opening, "Lycidas" reflects the typical pastoral image of nature and country life tarnished by death. The swain describes seeing laurels and “Myrtle brown, with ivy never-sear,” an image of peace and tranquility that is disturbed when the speaker announces the death of Lycidas. This marks the beginning of the elegy and its subsequent presence throughout the poem. The poem rehearses the typical conventions of the pastoral elegy: nature's lament, the questioning of nymphs, repeated invocations of the muses, descriptions of flowers, and an apotheosis of the deceased. A series of other speakers interrupt the swain's mourning to interject their own thoughts and concerns into the poem. These speakers include Phoebus, the classical sun god, who also represents poetry; and "the pilot of the Galilean Sea," St. Peter, whose "dread voice" momentarily banishes the pastoral mood of the poem while prophesying against the "corrupted clergy" of the Laudian church in England. The balance between conventional pastoral imagery and these other elements has, over time, created the impression that Lycidas is one of the most innovative pastoral elegies.

In "The Life of Milton," the 18th-century literary critic and polymath Samuel Johnson infamously called the pastoral form "easy, vulgar, and therefore disgusting," and said of "Lycidas":

It is not to be considered as the effusion of real passion; for passion runs not after remote allusions and obscure opinions. Passion plucks no berries from the myrtle and ivy, nor calls upon Arethuse and Mincius, nor tells of rough satyrs and fauns with cloven heel. Where there is leisure for fiction there is little grief.

Johnson was reacting to what he saw as the irrelevance of the pastoral idiom in Milton's age and his own, and to its ineffectiveness at conveying genuine emotion. Johnson said that conventional pastoral images—for instance, the representation of the speaker and the deceased as shepherds—were "long ago exhausted," and so improbable that they "always forces dissatisfaction on the mind." Johnson also criticized the blending of Christian and pagan images and themes in "Lyciads," which he saw as the poem's "grosser fault." He said "Lycidas" positions the “trifling fictions” of “heathen deities—Jove and Pheobus, Neptune and Æolus” alongside “the most awful and sacred truths, such as ought never to be polluted with such irreverend combinations.

Johnson concludes: "Surely no man could have fancied that he read Lycidas with pleasure had he not known its author."

“Adonaïs”

Percy Bysshe Shelley's Adonaïs is a pastoral elegy written by Shelley immediately after hearing about the death of John Keats. The elegy is 495 lines long, consisting of a total of 55 Spenserian stanzas. Adonaïs was composed during the spring of 1821 and was eventually published in July 1821. Studying the works of many classical pastoral elegies himself, Shelley admired Milton's poetic voice and form in Lycidas. Thus, Shelley composed Adonaïs specifically in the tradition of Milton's Lycidas

Introduced to each other by their mutual friend Leigh Hunt in late 1816, Shelley and Keats often exchanged letters of advice about their works of poetry. With the maturation of Keats's genius, Shelly eventually became a devout and enthusiastic admirer of Keats. Keats's eventual illness, believed by Shelley to be directly related to the harsh criticism and negative reviews of Keats's poetry, prompted Shelley to invite Keats to stay with him in Italy. Keats declined Shelley's request, traveling instead with his companion Joseph Severn. Later proven to be suffering from tuberculosis, Keats died on February 23, 1821. Mourning the death of his friend, Shelley's grief is captured in the first stanza of the poem where the death of Adonaïs, who represents Keats, is announced. Shelley's grief is also palpable in the subsequent mourning:

"I weep for Adonaïs - he is dead!

Oh, weep for Adonaïs! though our tears Thaw not the frost which binds so dear a head! And thou, sad Hour, selected from all years To mourn our loss, rouse thy obscure compeers, And teach them thine own sorrow, say: ‘With me Died Adonaïs; till the Future dares Forget the Past, his fate and fame shall be

An echo and a light unto eternity!"

Thyrsis

Written by Matthew Arnold in December 1865, Thyrsis is a personal elegy that mourns the death of Matthew's friend Arthur Hugh Clough. Clough died in November 1861 at the age of 42. The poem's plot revolves around the main character Thyrsis, a shepherd in Virgil's seventh Eclogue, who loses a singing match against Corydon. Matthew Arnold's character Thyrsis represents Matthew's friend Arthur Clough. Keeping with the tradition of pastoral elegy poetry, Arnold displays pastoral elements in the poem as he describes the nature surrounding Oxford.

== Brief summaries of literary criticisms ==
Literary criticism on Pastoral Literature in the English Renaissance

The pastoral is a literary style that presents a conventionalized picture of rural life, the naturalness and innocence of which is seen in contrast to the corruption and artificiality of city and court. Although pastoral works are written from the point of view of shepherds or rustics, they are always penned by highly sophisticated, urban poets. Some of the criticism towards this genre stems from its tensions between nature and art, the real and the ideal, and the actual and the mythical. English Renaissance pastoral has classical roots, but contains distinctly contemporary English elements, including humanism, sentimentality, depictions of courtly reality, a concern with real life, and the use of satire and comedy

Literary Criticism on Milton's Lycidas

"One way of describing more precisely that sense of mingled familiarity and strangeness is to consider what Milton has done with the most formal and conspicuous of the devices by which the pastoral elegist places sorrow: the frame. Some Renaissance elegists (among them Sannazaro, Marot, and Spenser) continue in the classical manner, framing the sorrowful lament within a dialogue between two happier, or at least more detached, herdsmen. Others (as Castiglione and Scève) expose their speakers’ sufferings to our more immediate view by dispensing with the frame altogether. And still others (as Petrarch and Boccaccio) convey sorrow’s gradual encroachment by placing it in a sweet, framing world at the outset but then permitting that world to merge with the world of lament at the close. Milton is, to my knowledge, the only pastoral elegist to dispense with the opening frame while retaining the closing one. And the effect of this maneuver is to reveal the elegist only gradually discovering through the course of the poem itself those assurances of order traditionally conferred by the frame: the poise, the detachment, the knowledge that our sorrows have a place in nature’s world of death and regeneration. We can no longer assume these things at the start. The happy outcome of this elegist’s journey toward his consolation must remain in doubt right up to the final stage of that journey. Milton’s handling of the frame epitomizes his handling of the convention as a whole and his synthesis of the two main Renaissance approaches to the tradition. He brings the self-consciousness, the isolation of the Petrarchan elegist, or of Scève’s Arion on his lonely shore, home to his own version of that consoling pastoral landscape rediscovered and revitalized by Sannazaro, Marot, Ronsard, and Spenser. Milton brings the anguish and singularity of an individual mourner’s grief into nature’s round and into the consolations of an aesthetic order. But he brings them in gradually and not without a struggle."

– Ellen Lambert

== Bibliography ==
- "Glossary of Poetic Terms, Letter E".
- C. John Holcombe (2004–2012). "ANALYZING THE PASTORAL ELEGY".
- "John Keats".
- G Kim Blank & Margot K. Louis, eds. (1993). Influence and Resistance in Nineteenth-Century English Poetry. Palgrave Macmillan. ISBN 978-0312102111.
