= Jean Jules Verdenal =

French medical officer during WWI

Jean Jules Verdenal (11 May 1890 – 2 May 1915) was a French medical officer who served, and was killed, during the First World War. Verdenal and his life remain obscure; the little that is known comes mainly from interviews with family members and several surviving letters.

Verdenal was born in Pau, France, the son of Paul Verdenal, a medical doctor. He had a talent for foreign languages. He was athletically inclined. Verdenal as a student was interested in literature and poetry and possessed copies of Stéphane Mallarmé's Poésies and of Jules Laforgue's Poésies and Moralités Légendaires. It was perhaps Verdenal's literary inclinations that led him to become friends with American poet T.S. Eliot, whom he met in 1910 at the Sorbonne. After they parted ways, Verdenal and Eliot corresponded through letters. Verdenal was killed on 2 May 1915 while treating a wounded man on the battlefield. This was just a week into the Gallipoli Campaign and a few days shy of his twenty-fifth birthday.

== Influence of Verdenal on Eliot ==
In 1917, Eliot dedicated to Verdenal his first volume of poetry, Prufrock and Other Observations, and added the Dante epigraph to the 1925 edition:

For Jean Verdenal, 1889–1915 mort aux Dardanelles

Or puoi la quantitate
Comprender dell' amor ch'a te mi scalda,
Quando dismento nostra vanitate,
Trattando l'ombre come cosa salda.

(Purgatorio xxi, 133-6) The shade of the Roman poet Statius addresses that of fellow Roman poet Virgil in purgatory. [Now can you understand the quantity of love that warms me towards you, so that I forget our vanity, and treat the shadows like the solid thing.]

Imagery reminiscent of Verdenal can also be found in other works, such as The Waste Land. Although he died young and his potential was unrealised, Verdenal's memory is preserved in the work of his friend.

== Verdenal in publications ==
In 1952 John Peter, later a novelist but then a Canadian academic, published an essay, "A New Interpretation of The Waste Land" in the journal Essays in Criticism in which he interpreted Eliot's poem The Waste Land as an elegy for a dead (male) friend. The journal got a demand from Eliot's solicitors to stop distributing the issue. The copies still on hand were destroyed and a later reprint of journal issues did not include Peter's essay. Peter wrote a letter of apology to Eliot. Seventeen years later, in 1969, four years after Eliot's death in 1965, Peter's essay was reprinted (although Peter wrote "The foregoing reprints almost verbatim an essay which was printed in Essays in Criticism in July 1952" Timothy Materer found substantial changes from the 1952 essay.) Following this reprint was another essay by Peter, titled "Postscript," where he both described the events and his feelings about the censoring and also expanding upon his original essay. In this second essay Peter identified the friend as Verdenal and quoted Eliot poems, plays and criticism to defend his position.

In 1971 Eliot's drafts to The Waste Land were published in facsimile along with notes by Valerie Eliot, the poet's widow. In January 1972, as part of a series of letters to the London Times Literary Supplement about Eliot's drafts, G. Wilson Knight made the observation that the so-called "hyacinth girl" was male. Knight expanded upon his observation in an essay later that year.

In the early 1970s George Watson made trips to France to learn more about Verdenal from his military record, his family and friends. Watson's article, "Quest for a Frenchman," published in 1976, presented his discoveries.

James E. Miller, who felt that there was a personal meaning to The Waste Land, had his attention drawn to Peter and Knight. Miller expanded upon Peter's essays and his book, T. S. Eliot's Personal Waste Land, was published in 1977.

In 1998 Miller wrote about Verdenal's letters to Eliot (not available to him or to the public until 1988 when Valerie Eliot published letters by and to Eliot in the first volume of an intended series.)

Claudio Perinot, wanting to expand the scant knowledge about Verdenal, interviewed Verdenal's nephew in 1994. Perinot's findings were published in 1996.

In 2005 Miller also had a biography of Eliot published. In the biography (covering the years 1888–1922) Miller provided a synopsis of Watson's and Perinot's findings and the contents of Verdenal's letters to Eliot.

Claudio Perinot continued his research on Jean Verdenal and, in 2008, published further information concerning the Frenchman's cultural and family background; for the first time, the precise cause of Verdenal's death was also made known. Then, in 2011, Perinot published a composite micro-biography of Eliot's French friend, based on previously unpublished documents, such as obituary notices, photographs, letters, and reminiscences of the people who knew Jean Verdenal.
