= When Lilacs Last in the Dooryard Bloom'd (Hindemith) =

1946 composition by Paul Hindemith

When Lilacs Last in the Dooryard Bloom'd: A Requiem for those we love
- Oratorio by Paul Hindemith
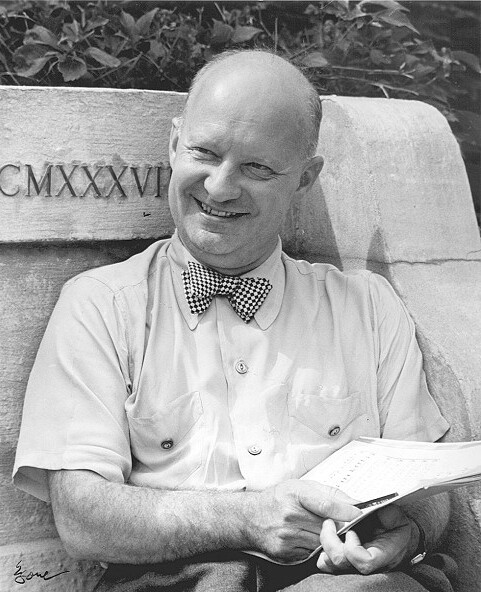
- The composer in 1945
- Occasion: Memory of Franklin D. Roosevelt
- Text: "When Lilacs Last in the Dooryard Bloom'd" by Walt Whitman
- Language: English
- Composed: 1946
- Performed: 14 May 1946: New York City
- Movements: 11
- Scoring: mezzo-soprano; baritone; mixed choir; orchestra

When Lilacs Last in the Dooryard Bloom'd: A Requiem for those we love (An American Requiem) is a 1946 oratorio by composer Paul Hindemith, based on the poem of the same name by Walt Whitman. It is the first musical work to include the entirety of Whitman's 1865 poem. Conductor Robert Shaw and the Robert Shaw Chorale commissioned the work after the 1945 death of President Franklin D. Roosevelt. It received its world premiere on May 14, 1946, at New York City Center, with the Collegiate Chorale conducted by Shaw and soloists Mona Paulee, contralto, and George Burnson, baritone. Paulee performed the work again with bass-baritone Chester Watson and the CBS Symphony Orchestra for the work's first recorded broadcast on CBS Radio on June 30, 1946.

David Neumeyer and others regard the Lilacs Requiem as Hindemith's "only profoundly American work." Paul Hume said, "I doubt if we shall ever mourn Abraham Lincoln's untimely death more eloquently than in the words of Walt Whitman set to the music of Paul Hindemith; it is a work of genius and the presence of the genius presiding over its performance brought us splendor and profound and moving glory."

The work is scored for mezzo-soprano and baritone soloists, SATB chorus, and full orchestra. After an unnumbered orchestral introduction, the text of the poem is divided into 11 movements:

1. When lilacs last in the dooryard bloom'd (baritone and chorus)
2. Arioso. In the swamp (mezzo-soprano)
3. March. Over the breast of spring
4. O western orb (baritone and chorus)
5. Arioso. Sing on, there in the swamp
6. Song. O how shall I warble
7. Introduction and Fugue. Lo! body and soul
8. Sing on! you gray-brown bird
9. Death Carol. Come, lovely and soothing Death (chorus)
10. To the tally of my soul
11. Finale. Passing the visions (mezzo-soprano, baritone, and chorus)

The work is scored for mezzo-soprano and baritone soloists, mixed choir, and an orchestra of 2 flutes (one doubling piccolo), 2 oboes (one doubling cor anglais), clarinet, bass clarinet, 2 bassoons (one doubling contrabassoon), 3 horns, 2 trumpets, off-stage bugle, 2 trombones, tuba, timpani, cymbals, glockenspiel, chimes, tam-tam, triangle, snare drum, bass drum, field drum, organ, and strings (first & second violins, violas, cellos, and double basses).

== Musical process ==
Hindemith was drawn to Whitman's poem through its theme of nobility, fate and death. Written in memory of Abraham Lincoln, Whitman's poem fitted the theme of the country at this time of mourning. Subtitling his work, "An American Requiem", Hindemith broke into the scene of American musical culture which was out of character for the German-based composer. Along with introducing himself to the American soundscape, Hindemith also used his requiem to begin deviating from the Romantic style of music. Rather than composing in dense sonority, he now introduced the new use of polyphony - giving each instrument their own individual and important parts, using dissonance to ensure each part stood out against the others. Tonal functional harmony no longer existed as part of Hindemith's arsenal of compositional procedures. Through all of Hindemith's many works, he had established a sound regarded by critics as "Hindemithian". This piece in particular combined this sound with a surprising reflection of American culture.

== Perception ==
Because Hindemith was German-born, the idea of his composing a work dedicated to an American president troubled a portion of the country. Though Hindemith had become an American citizen, he was not yet regarded as an American composer. His identity as a composer raised many questions, one of the biggest being his decision to translate the poem into German.
