= John Peter (novelist) =

South African–Canadian writer (1921–1983)

John Desmond Peter (1921–1983) was a South African–Canadian English-literature scholar, essayist, and novelist.

== Education ==
He studied law at the University of South Africa, and English literature at Cambridge University, later obtaining his Ph.D. from Rhodes University.

== Career ==
Peter came to Canada in 1950 and taught English at the University of Manitoba for eleven years. He joined the Victoria College Department of English in 1961. He was co-founder, with Robin Skelton, of the literary magazine Malahat Review.

He is remembered mostly widely for his 1952 essay "A New Interpretation of The Waste Land", in which he interpreted T.S. Eliot's poem as an elegy for a dead (male) friend, Jean Verdenal. At the insistence of Eliot's solicitors, it was suppressed and only republished in 1969, four years after Eliot's death.

== Published works ==
=== Criticism ===
- Complaint and Satire in Early English Literature (1956)
- A Critique of "Paradise Lost" (1960)

=== Novels ===
- Along That Coast (1964) winner of the Doubleday Canadian Novel Prize
- Take Hands at Winter (1967)
- Runaway (1969)

=== Short stories ===
- Vallor (1978)
