= Nmon Ford =

American opera singer

Nmon Ford is an opera singer. He earned his Bachelor's and Master's degrees from the University of Southern California Thornton School of Music. In June 2013, Ford sang the title role in Ernest Bloch's opera, Macbeth, at the Long Beach Opera. According to the Los Angeles Times, Ford "made an overwhelming impression as Macbeth in all his facets".
