= List of Linyphiidae species (A–H) =

This page lists all described species of the spider family Linyphiidae as of August 28, 2020, from A to H, of World Spider Catalog version 21.5

== Abacoproeces ==
Abacoproeces Simon, 1884

- Abacoproeces molestus Thaler, 1973 — Austria
- Abacoproeces saltuum (L. Koch, 1872) (type species) — Palearctic
- Abacoproeces topcui Türkeş, Karabulut, Demir & Seyyar, 2015 - Turkey

== Aberdaria ==
Aberdaria Holm, 1962

- Aberdaria ligulata Holm, 1962 — Kenya

== Abiskoa ==
Abiskoa Saaristo & Tanasevitch, 2000

- Abiskoa abiskoensis (Holm, 1945) — Palearctic

== Acanoides ==
Acanoides Sun, Marusik & Tu, 2014

- Acanoides beijingensis Sun, Marusik & Tu, 2014 (type species) - China
- Acanoides hengshanensis (Chen & Yin, 2000) - China

== Acanthoneta ==
Acanthoneta Eskov & Marusik, 1992

- Acanthoneta aggressa (Chamberlin & Ivie, 1943) (type species) - USA, Canada
- Acanthoneta dokutchaevi (Eskov & Marusik, 1994) - Russia, China
- Acanthoneta furcata (Emerton, 1913) - USA

== Acartauchenius ==
Acartauchenius Simon, 1884

- Acartauchenius asiaticus (Tanasevitch, 1989) — Turkmenistan
- Acartauchenius bedeli (Simon, 1884) — Algeria
- Acartauchenius derisor (Simon, 1918) — France
- Acartauchenius desertus (Tanasevitch, 1993) — Kazakhstan
- Acartauchenius hamulifer (Denis, 1937) — Algeria
- Acartauchenius himalayensis Tanasevitch, 2011 — Pakistan
- Acartauchenius insigniceps (Simon, 1894) — Morocco, Algeria, Tunisia
- Acartauchenius leprieuri (O. P.-Cambridge, 1875) — Algeria
- Acartauchenius minor (Millidge, 1979) — Italy
- Acartauchenius monoceros (Tanasevitch, 1989) — Uzbekistan
- Acartauchenius mutabilis (Denis, 1967) — Morocco, Algeria, Tunisia
- Acartauchenius orientalis Wunderlich, 1995 — Mongolia
- Acartauchenius planiceps Bosmans, 2002 — Algeria
- Acartauchenius praeceps Bosmans, 2002 — Algeria
- Acartauchenius sardiniensis Wunderlich, 1995 — Sardinia
- Acartauchenius scurrilis (O. P.-Cambridge, 1872) (type species) — Palearctic
- Acartauchenius simoni Bosmans, 2002 — Algeria

== Acorigone ==
Acorigone Wunderlich, 2008

- Acorigone acoreensis (Wunderlich, 1992) — Azores
- Acorigone zebraneus Wunderlich, 2008 (type species) — Azores

== Adelonetria ==
Adelonetria Millidge, 1991

- Adelonetria dubiosa Millidge, 1991 — Chile

== Afribactrus ==
Afribactrus Wunderlich, 1995

- Afribactrus stylifrons Wunderlich, 1995 — South Africa

== Afromynoglenes ==
Afromynoglenes Merrett & Russell-Smith, 1996

- Afromynoglenes parkeri Merrett & Russell-Smith, 1996 — Ethiopia

== Afroneta ==
Afroneta Holm, 1968

- Afroneta altivaga Holm, 1968 — Congo
- Afroneta annulata Merrett, 2004 — Congo
- Afroneta bamilekei Bosmans, 1988 — Cameroon
- Afroneta basilewskyi Holm, 1968 — Tanzania
- Afroneta blesti Merrett & Russell-Smith, 1996 — Ethiopia
- Afroneta elgonensis Merrett, 2004 — Kenya
- Afroneta erecta Merrett, 2004 — Congo
- Afroneta flavescens Frick & Scharff, 2018 — Kenya
- Afroneta fulva Merrett, 2004 — Congo
- Afroneta fusca Merrett, 2004 — Congo
- Afroneta guttata Holm, 1968 — Congo
- Afroneta immaculata Holm, 1968 (type species) — Congo
- Afroneta immaculoides Merrett, 2004 — Congo
- Afroneta lativulva Merrett, 2004 — Congo
- Afroneta lobeliae Merrett, 2004 — Congo
- Afroneta longipalpis Ledoux & Attié, 2008 — Reunion
- Afroneta longispinosa Holm, 1968 — Congo
- Afroneta maculata Merrett, 2004 — Congo
- Afroneta millidgei Merrett & Russell-Smith, 1996 — Ethiopia
- Afroneta pallens Merrett, 2004 — Congo
- Afroneta picta Holm, 1968 — Congo
- Afroneta praticola Holm, 1968 — Tanzania
- Afroneta sarahae Frick & Scharff, 2018 — Kenya
- Afroneta serrata Frick & Scharff, 2018 — Kenya
- Afroneta snazelli Merrett & Russell-Smith, 1996 — Ethiopia
- Afroneta subfusca Holm, 1968 — Congo
- Afroneta subfuscoides Merrett, 2004 — Congo
- Afroneta tenuivulva Merrett, 2004 — Congo
- Afroneta tristis Merrett, 2004 — Congo

== Agnyphantes ==
Agnyphantes Hull, 1932

- Agnyphantes arboreus (Emerton, 1915) — Canada
- Agnyphantes expunctus (O. P.-Cambridge, 1875) (type species) — Palearctic

== Agyneta ==
Agyneta Hull, 1911

- Agyneta adami (Millidge, 1991) — Brazil
- Agyneta affinis (Kulczynski, 1898) — Palearctic
- Agyneta affinisoides Tanasevitch, 1984 — Russia
- Agyneta albinotata (Millidge, 1991) — Colombia
- Agyneta alboguttata (Jocque, 1985) — Comoro Islands
- Agyneta albomaculata (Baert, 1990) — Galapagos Islands
- Agyneta allosubtilis Loksa, 1965 — Holarctic
- Agyneta alpica Tanasevitch, 2000 — Switzerland, Austria
- Agyneta amersaxatilis Saaristo & Koponen, 1998 — USA, Canada, Alaska, Russia
- Agyneta angulata (Emerton, 1882) — USA, Canada
- Agyneta aquila Duperre, 2013 — Canada
- Agyneta arida (Baert, 1990) — Galapagos Islands
- Agyneta arietans (O. P.-Cambridge, 1872) — Germany, Poland
- Agyneta atra (Millidge, 1991) — Venezuela
- Agyneta barfoot Duperre, 2013 — USA
- Agyneta barrowsi (Chamberlin & Ivie, 1944) — USA, Canada
- Agyneta bermudensis (Strand, 1906) — Bermuda
- Agyneta birulai (Kulczynski, 1908) — Russia, China
- Agyneta birulaioides Wunderlich, 1995 — Ukraine, Kazakhstan, Russia, Mongolia
- Agyneta boninensis (Saito, 1982) — Japan
- Agyneta breviceps Hippa & Oksala, 1985 — Finland
- Agyneta brevipes (Keyserling, 1886) — USA, Alaska
- Agyneta brevis (Millidge, 1991) — Peru
- Agyneta bronx Duperre, 2013 — USA
- Agyneta brusnewi (Kulczynski, 1908) — Russia
- Agyneta bucklei Duperre, 2013 — USA, Canada
- Agyneta bueko Wunderlich, 1983 — Nepal
- Agyneta bulavintsevi Tanasevitch, 2016 - Russia (Europe, Siberia)
- Agyneta canariensis Wunderlich, 1987 — Canary Islands
- Agyneta castanea (Millidge, 1991) — Chile
- Agyneta catalina Duperre, 2013 — USA
- Agyneta cauta (O. P.-Cambridge, 1902) — Palearctic
- Agyneta chiricahua Duperre, 2013 — USA
- Agyneta cincta (Millidge, 1991) — Colombia
- Agyneta collina (Millidge, 1991) — Colombia
- Agyneta conigera (O. P.-Cambridge, 1863) — Palearctic, Congo
- Agyneta crawfordi Duperre, 2013 — USA
- Agyneta crista Duperre, 2013 — USA
- Agyneta cuneata Tanasevitch, 2014 - Russia
- Agyneta curvata (Bosmans, 1979) — Kenya
- Agyneta dactylis (Tao, Li & Zhu, 1995) — China
- Agyneta danielbelangeri Duperre, 2013 — USA, Canada
- Agyneta darrelli Duperre, 2013 — USA, Canada
- Agyneta decora (O. P.-Cambridge, 1871) (type species) — Holarctic
- Agyneta decorata (Chamberlin & Ivie, 1944) — USA
- Agyneta decurvis (Tao, Li & Zhu, 1995) — China
- Agyneta delphina Duperre, 2013 — USA
- Agyneta dentifera (Locket, 1968) — Nigeria, Angola
- Agyneta depigmentata Wunderlich, 2008 — Azores
- Agyneta discolor (Millidge, 1991) — Colombia
- Agyneta disjuncta (Millidge, 1991) — Colombia
- Agyneta dynica Saaristo & Koponen, 1998 — USA, Canada
- Agyneta emertoni (Roewer, 1942) — Canada
- Agyneta equestris (L. Koch, 1881) — Central Europe, Ukraine
- Agyneta erinacea Duperre, 2013 — USA
- Agyneta evadens (Chamberlin, 1925) — USA, Canada
- Agyneta exigua (Russell-Smith, 1992) — Cameroon, Nigeria
- Agyneta fabra (Keyserling, 1886) — USA, Canada
- Agyneta falcata (Li & Zhu, 1995) — China
- Agyneta fillmorana (Chamberlin, 1919) — USA, Canada
- Agyneta flandroyae (Jocque, 1985) — Comoro Islands
- Agyneta flavipes (Ono, 1991) — Japan
- Agyneta flax Duperre, 2013 — USA
- Agyneta flibuscrocus Duperre, 2013 — USA
- Agyneta floridana (Banks, 1896) — USA
- Agyneta fratrella (Chamberlin, 1919) — USA
- Agyneta frigida (Millidge, 1991) — Colombia
- Agyneta furcula Seo, 2018 — Korea
- Agyneta fusca (Millidge, 1991) — Peru
- Agyneta fuscipalpa (C. L. Koch, 1836) — Palearctic
- Agyneta gagnei (Gertsch, 1973) — Hawaii
- Agyneta galapagosensis (Baert, 1990) — Galapagos Islands, Brazil
- Agyneta girardi Duperre, 2013 — USA, Canada
- Agyneta gracilipes (Holm, 1968) — Cameroon, Gabon, Congo, Kenya, Angola
- Agyneta grandcanyon Duperre, 2013 — USA
- Agyneta gulosa (L. Koch, 1869) — Palearctic
- Agyneta habra (Locket, 1968) — Africa
- Agyneta hedini Paquin & Duperre, 2009 — USA
- Agyneta ignorata (Saito, 1982) — Japan
- Agyneta inermis Tanasevitch, 2019 — Italy, Greece
- Agyneta innotabilis (O. P.-Cambridge, 1863) — Europe, Russia
- Agyneta insolita (Locket & Russell-Smith, 1980) — Nigeria
- Agyneta insulana Tanasevitch, 2000 — Sakhalin, Kurile Islands
- Agyneta iranica Tanasevitch, 2011 — Iran
- Agyneta issaqueena Duperre, 2013 — USA
- Agyneta jacksoni (Braendegaard, 1937) — USA, Canada, Alaska, Greenland
- Agyneta jiriensis Wunderlich, 1983 — Nepal
- Agyneta kaszabi (Loksa, 1965) — Russia, Kazakhstan, Mongolia
- Agyneta kopetdaghensis Tanasevitch, 1989 — Iran, Turkmenistan
- Agyneta laimonasi Tanasevitch, 2006 — Russia
- Agyneta larva (Locket, 1968) — Angola
- Agyneta lauta (Millidge, 1991) — Peru
- Agyneta ledfordi Duperre, 2013 — USA
- Agyneta leucophora (Chamberlin & Ivie, 1944) — USA
- Agyneta levii Tanasevitch, 1984 — Russia
- Agyneta levis (Locket, 1968) — Angola
- Agyneta lila (Dönitz & Strand, 1906) — Japan
- Agyneta llanoensis (Gertsch & Davis, 1936) — USA
- Agyneta longipes (Chamberlin & Ivie, 1944) — USA
- Agyneta lophophor (Chamberlin & Ivie, 1933) — USA, Canada, Alaska
- Agyneta luctuosa (Millidge, 1991) — Venezuela
- Agyneta manni (Crawford & Edwards, 1989) — USA
- Agyneta maritima (Emerton, 1919) — Russia, Mongolia, Canada, Alaska
- Agyneta martensi Tanasevitch, 2006 — China
- Agyneta mediocris (Millidge, 1991) — Colombia
- Agyneta mendosa (Millidge, 1991) — Colombia
- Agyneta merretti (Locket, 1968) — Angola
- Agyneta mesasiatica Tanasevitch, 2000 — Russia, Iran, Central Asia
- Agyneta metatarsialis Tanasevitch, 2014 - Russia
- Agyneta metropolis (Russell-Smith & Jocque, 1986) — Kenya
- Agyneta micaria (Emerton, 1882) — USA, Canada
- Agyneta milleri (Thaler et al., 1997) — Czech Republic, Slovakia
- Agyneta mingshengzhui (Barrion, Barrion-Dupo & Heong, 2013) - China
- Agyneta miniata Duperre, 2013 — USA
- Agyneta minorata (Chamberlin & Ivie, 1944) — USA
- Agyneta mollis (O. P.-Cambridge, 1871) — Palearctic, Alaska, Canada
- Agyneta mongolica (Loksa, 1965) — Russia, Mongolia
- Agyneta montana (Millidge, 1991) — Ecuador
- Agyneta montivaga (Millidge, 1991) — Venezuela
- Agyneta mossica (Schikora, 1993) — Britain to Russia
- Agyneta muriensis Wunderlich, 1983 — Nepal
- Agyneta natalensis (Jocque, 1984) — South Africa
- Agyneta nigra (Oi, 1960) — Russia, Mongolia, China, Korea, Japan
- Agyneta nigripes (Simon, 1884) — Canada, Greenland, Palearctic
  - Agyneta nigripes nivicola (Simon, 1929) — France
- Agyneta obscura (Denis, 1950) — Congo, Tanzania
- Agyneta oculata (Millidge, 1991) — Peru
- Agyneta okefenokee Duperre, 2013 — USA
- Agyneta olivacea (Emerton, 1882) — Holarctic
- Agyneta opaca (Millidge, 1991) — Colombia
- Agyneta ordinaria (Chamberlin & Ivie, 1947) — USA, Canada, Alaska
- Agyneta orites (Thorell, 1875) — Central Europe
- Agyneta pakistanica Tanasevitch, 2011 — Pakistan
- Agyneta palgongsanensis (Paik, 1991) — Russia, China, Korea
- Agyneta palustris (Li & Zhu, 1995) — China
- Agyneta panthera Duperre, 2013 — USA
- Agyneta paquini Duperre, 2013 — USA
- Agyneta paraprosecta Tanasevitch, 2010 — UAE
- Agyneta parva (Banks, 1896) — USA
- Agyneta perspicua Duperre, 2013 — USA, Canada, Alaska
- Agyneta picta (Chamberlin & Ivie, 1944) — USA
- Agyneta pinicola Gnelitsa, 2014 - Ukraine
- Agyneta pinta (Baert, 1990) — Galapagos Islands
- Agyneta pistrix Duperre, 2013 — USA
- Agyneta plagiata (Banks, 1929) — Panama
- Agyneta platnicki Duperre, 2013 — USA
- Agyneta pogonophora (Locket, 1968) — Angola, Seychelles
- Agyneta prima (Millidge, 1991) — Colombia
- Agyneta propinqua (Millidge, 1991) — Peru, Brazil
- Agyneta propria (Millidge, 1991) — Ecuador
- Agyneta prosectes (Locket, 1968) — St. Helena, Africa
- Agyneta prosectoides (Locket & Russell-Smith, 1980) — Cameroon, Nigeria
- Agyneta protrudens (Chamberlin & Ivie, 1933) — USA, Canada
- Agyneta proxima (Millidge, 1991) — Colombia
- Agyneta pseudofuscipalpis Wunderlich, 1983 — Nepal
- Agyneta pseudorurestris Wunderlich, 1980 — Portugal, Spain, Cyprus, Sardinia, Algeria, Tunisia, Israel
- Agyneta pseudosaxatilis Tanasevitch, 1984 — Russia, Kazakhstan
- Agyneta punctata Wunderlich, 1995 — Greece, Turkey
- Agyneta ramosa Jackson, 1912 — Palearctic
- Agyneta regina (Chamberlin & Ivie, 1944) — USA
- Agyneta ressli (Wunderlich, 1973) — Germany, Switzerland, Austria, Greece
- Agyneta ripariensis Tanasevitch, 1984 — Russia
- Agyneta rufidorsa (Denis, 1961) — France
- Agyneta rugosa Wunderlich, 1992 — Canary Islands, Azores
- Agyneta rurestris (C. L. Koch, 1836) — Palearctic
- Agyneta saaristoi Tanasevitch, 2000 — Russia, Kazakhstan
- Agyneta sandia Duperre, 2013 — USA
- Agyneta saxatilis (Blackwall, 1844) — Europe, Russia
- Agyneta semipallida (Chamberlin & Ivie, 1944) — USA
- Agyneta serrata (Emerton, 1909) — USA, Canada
- Agyneta serratichelis (Denis, 1964) — Sudan
- Agyneta serratula Wunderlich, 1995 — Mongolia
- Agyneta sheffordiana Duperre & Paquin, 2007 — Canada
- Agyneta silvae (Millidge, 1991) — Peru
- Agyneta similis (Kulczynski, 1926) — Iceland, Finland, Russia, Kazakhstan
- Agyneta simplex (Emerton, 1926) — USA, Canada, Alaska
- Agyneta simplicitarsis (Simon, 1884) — Europe, Russia, Kazakhstan
- Agyneta spicula Duperre, 2013 — USA
- Agyneta straminicola (Millidge, 1991) — Colombia, Ecuador
- Agyneta subnivalis Tanasevitch, 1989 — Central Asia
- Agyneta subtilis (O. P.-Cambridge, 1863) — Palearctic
- Agyneta suecica Holm, 1950 — Sweden, Finland
- Agyneta tenuipes (Ono, 2007) — Japan
- Agyneta tianschanica Tanasevitch, 1989 — Kyrgyzstan
- Agyneta tibialis Tanasevitch, 2005 — Russia
- Agyneta tincta (Jocque, 1985) — Comoro Islands
- Agyneta transversa (Banks, 1898) — Mexico
- Agyneta trifurcata Hippa & Oksala, 1985 — Finland, Russia
- Agyneta tuberculata Duperre, 2013 — USA
- Agyneta unicornis (Tao, Li & Zhu, 1995) — China
- Agyneta unimaculata (Banks, 1892) — USA, Canada
- Agyneta usitata (Locket, 1968) — Nigeria, Angola
- Agyneta uta (Chamberlin, 1920) — USA
- Agyneta uzbekistanica Tanasevitch, 1984 — Central Asia
- Agyneta vera Wunderlich, 1976 — Queensland
- Agyneta vinki Duperre, 2013 — USA
- Agyneta watertoni Duperre, 2013 — Canada
- Agyneta yukona Duperre, 2013 — Canada
- Agyneta yulungiensis Wunderlich, 1983 — Nepal

== Agyphantes ==
Agyphantes Saaristo & Marusik, 2004

- Agyphantes sajanensis (Eskov & Marusik, 1994) — Russia
- Agyphantes sakhalinensis Saaristo & Marusik, 2004 (type species) — Sakhalin Islands

== Ainerigone ==
Ainerigone Eskov, 1993

- Ainerigone saitoi (Ono, 1991) — Russia, Japan

== Alioranus ==
Alioranus Simon, 1926

- Alioranus chiardolae (Caporiacco, 1935) — Turkmenistan to China, Karakorum
- Alioranus diclivitalis Tanasevitch, 1990 — Russia
- Alioranus distinctus Caporiacco, 1935 — Karakorum
- Alioranus minutissimus Caporiacco, 1935 — Karakorum
- Alioranus pastoralis (O. P.-Cambridge, 1872) — Crete, Cyprus, Turkey, Israel, Jordan, Tajikistan
- Alioranus pauper (Simon, 1881) (type species) — Western Mediterranean

== Allomengea ==
Allomengea Strand, 1912

- Allomengea beombawigulensis Namkung, 2002 — Korea
- Allomengea coreana (Paik & Yaginuma, 1969) — Korea
- Allomengea dentisetis (Grube, 1861) — Holarctic
- Allomengea niyangensis (Hu, 2001) — China
- Allomengea scopigera (Grube, 1859) (type species) — Holarctic
- Allomengea vidua (L. Koch, 1879) — Holarctic

== Allotiso ==
Allotiso Tanasevitch, 1990

- Allotiso lancearius (Tanasevitch, 1987) — Turkey, Georgia

== Anacornia ==
Anacornia Chamberlin & Ivie, 1933

- Anacornia microps Chamberlin & Ivie, 1933 (type species) — USA
- Anacornia proceps Chamberlin, 1949 — USA

== Anguliphantes ==
Anguliphantes Saaristo & Tanasevitch, 1996

- Anguliphantes angulipalpis (Westring, 1851) (type species) — Palearctic
- Anguliphantes cerinus (L. Koch, 1879) — Russia, Kazakhstan
- Anguliphantes curvus (Tanasevitch, 1992) — Russia
- Anguliphantes dybowskii (O. P.-Cambridge, 1873) — Russia, Mongolia
- Anguliphantes karpinskii (O. P.-Cambridge, 1873) — Russia, Mongolia, China
- Anguliphantes maritimus (Tanasevitch, 1988) — Russia, China
- Anguliphantes monticola (Kulczynski, 1881) — Europe
- Anguliphantes nasus (Paik, 1965) — China, Korea
- Anguliphantes nepalensis (Tanasevitch, 1987) — India, Nepal, Pakistan
- Anguliphantes nepalensoides Tanasevitch, 2011 — India
- Anguliphantes ryvkini Tanasevitch, 2006 — Russia
- Anguliphantes sibiricus (Tanasevitch, 1986) — Russia
- Anguliphantes silli (Weiss, 1987) — Romania
- Anguliphantes tripartitus (Miller & Svaton, 1978) — Central Europe
- Anguliphantes ussuricus (Tanasevitch, 1988) — Russia
- Anguliphantes zygius (Tanasevitch, 1993) — Russia, China

== Anibontes ==
Anibontes Chamberlin, 1924

- Anibontes longipes Chamberlin & Ivie, 1944 — USA
- Anibontes mimus Chamberlin, 1924 (type species) — USA

== Annapolis ==
Annapolis Millidge, 1984

- Annapolis mossi (Muma, 1945) — USA

== Anodoration ==
Anodoration Millidge, 1991

- Anodoration claviferum Millidge, 1991 (type species) — Brazil, Argentina
- Anodoration tantillum (Millidge, 1991) — Brazil

== Anthrobia ==
Anthrobia Tellkampf, 1844

- Anthrobia acuminata (Emerton, 1913) — USA
- Anthrobia coylei Miller, 2005 — USA
- Anthrobia monmouthia Tellkampf, 1844 (type species) — USA
- Anthrobia whiteleyae Miller, 2005 — USA

== Antrohyphantes ==
Antrohyphantes Dumitrescu, 1971

- Antrohyphantes balcanicus (Drensky, 1931) — Bulgaria
- Antrohyphantes rhodopensis (Drensky, 1931) (type species) — Eastern Europe
- Antrohyphantes sophianus (Drensky, 1931) — Bulgaria

== Aperturina ==
'Aperturina' Tanasevitch, 2014 - Aperturina paniculus Tanasevitch, 2014 - Thailand, Malaysia

== Aphileta ==
Aphileta Hull, 1920

- Aphileta centrasiatica Eskov, 1995 — Kazakhstan
- Aphileta microtarsa (Emerton, 1882) — USA
- Aphileta misera (O. P.-Cambridge, 1882) (type species) — Holarctic

== Apobrata ==
Apobrata Miller, 2004

- Apobrata scutila (Simon, 1894) — Philippines

== Aprifrontalia ==
Aprifrontalia Oi, 1960

- Aprifrontalia afflata Ma & Zhu, 1991 — China
- Aprifrontalia mascula (Karsch, 1879) (type species) — Russia, Korea, Taiwan, Japan

== Arachosinella ==
Arachosinella Denis, 1958

- Arachosinella oeroegensis Wunderlich, 1995 — Mongolia
- Arachosinella strepens Denis, 1958 (type species) — Russia, Mongolia, Central Asia, Afghanistan

== Araeoncus ==
Araeoncus Simon, 1884

- Araeoncus altissimus Simon, 1884 — Europe to Azerbaijan
- Araeoncus anguineus (L. Koch, 1869) — Europe
- Araeoncus banias Tanasevitch, 2013 — Israel
- Araeoncus caucasicus Tanasevitch, 1987 — Russia, Iran, Central Asia
- Araeoncus clavatus Tanasevitch, 1987 — Turkey, Armenia
- Araeoncus clivifrons Deltshev, 1987 — Bulgaria
- Araeoncus convexus Tullgren, 1955 — Sweden, Estonia
- Araeoncus crassiceps (Westring, 1861) — Palearctic
- Araeoncus curvatus Tullgren, 1955 — Sweden, Estonia
- Araeoncus cypriacus Tanasevitch, 2011 — Cyprus
- Araeoncus discedens (Simon, 1881) — Spain, France, Italy
- Araeoncus dispar Tullgren, 1955 — Sweden
- Araeoncus duriusculus Caporiacco, 1935 — Karakorum
- Araeoncus etinde Bosmans & Jocque, 1983 — Cameroon
- Araeoncus femineus (Roewer, 1942) — Bioko
- Araeoncus galeriformis (Tanasevitch, 1987) — Russia, Azerbaijan
- Araeoncus gertschi Caporiacco, 1949 — Kenya
- Araeoncus hanno Simon, 1884 — Algeria
- Araeoncus humilis (Blackwall, 1841) (type species) — Palearctic, New Zealand
- Araeoncus hyalinus Song & Li, 2010 — China
- Araeoncus impolitus Holm, 1962 — Kenya
- Araeoncus longispineus Song & Li, 2010 — China
- Araeoncus longiusculus (O. P.-Cambridge, 1875) — Corsica, Sardinia, Italy
- Araeoncus macrophthalmus Miller, 1970 — Angola
- Araeoncus malawiensis Jocque, 1981 — Malawi
- Araeoncus martinae Bosmans, 1996 — Morocco, Algeria
- Araeoncus mitriformis Tanasevitch, 2008 — Iran
- Araeoncus obtusus Bosmans & Jocque, 1983 — Cameroon
- Araeoncus picturatus Holm, 1962 — Tanzania
- Araeoncus rhodes Tanasevitch, 2011 — Rhodes
- Araeoncus sicanus Brignoli, 1979 — Sicily
- Araeoncus subniger Holm, 1962 — Kenya
- Araeoncus tauricus Gnelitsa, 2005 — Bulgaria, Ukraine
- Araeoncus toubkal Bosmans, 1996 — Portugal, Morocco
- Araeoncus tuberculatus Tullgren, 1955 — Sweden
- Araeoncus vaporariorum (O. P.-Cambridge, 1875) — France, Italy
- Araeoncus victorianyanzae Berland, 1936 — Kenya, Tanzania
- Araeoncus viphyensis Jocque, 1981 — Malawi
- Araeoncus vorkutensis Tanasevitch, 1984 — Russia, Kazakhstan

== Archaraeoncus ==
Archaraeoncus Tanasevitch, 1987

- Archaraeoncus alticola Tanasevitch, 2008 — Iran
- Archaraeoncus hebraeus Tanasevitch, 2011 — Israel
- Archaraeoncus prospiciens (Thorell, 1875) (type species) — Eastern Europe to China
- Archaraeoncus sibiricus Eskov, 1988 — Russia

== Arcterigone ==
Arcterigone Eskov & Marusik, 1994

- Arcterigone pilifrons (L. Koch, 1879) — Russia, Canada

== Arcuphantes ==
Arcuphantes Chamberlin & Ivie, 1943

- Arcuphantes arcuatulus (Roewer, 1942) — USA, Canada
- Arcuphantes ashifuensis (Oi, 1960) — Japan
- Arcuphantes awanus Ono & Saito, 2001 — Japan
- Arcuphantes cavaticus Chamberlin & Ivie, 1943 — USA
- Arcuphantes chiakensis Seo, 2018 — Korea
- Arcuphantes chikunii Oi, 1979 — Japan
- Arcuphantes chilboensis Seo, 2018 — Korea
- Arcuphantes chinensis Tanasevitch, 2006 — China
- Arcuphantes concheus Ono & Saito, 2001 — Japan
- Arcuphantes cruciatus Jin, Ma & Tu, 2018 — USA
- Arcuphantes curvomarginatus Ma, Marusik & Tu, 2016 - USA
- Arcuphantes decoratus Chamberlin & Ivie, 1943 — USA
- Arcuphantes delicatus (Chikuni, 1955) — Japan
- Arcuphantes dentatus Ma, Marusik & Tu, 2016 - USA
- Arcuphantes digitatus Saito, 1992 — Japan
- Arcuphantes dubiosus Heimer, 1987 — Mongolia
- Arcuphantes elephantis Ono & Saito, 2001 — Japan
- Arcuphantes ephippiatus Paik, 1985 — Korea
- Arcuphantes fragilis Chamberlin & Ivie, 1943 (type species) — USA
- Arcuphantes fujiensis Yaginuma, 1972 — Japan
- Arcuphantes hamadai Oi, 1979 — Japan
- Arcuphantes hastatus Ono & Saito, 2001 — Japan
- Arcuphantes hikosanensis Saito, 1992 — Japan
- Arcuphantes hokkaidanus Saito, 1992 — Japan
- Arcuphantes iriei Saito, 1992 — Japan
- Arcuphantes juwangensis Seo, 2006 — Korea
- Arcuphantes keumsanensis Paik & Seo, 1984 — Korea
- Arcuphantes kobayashii Oi, 1979 — Japan
- Arcuphantes longiconvolutus Seo, 2018 — Korea
- Arcuphantes longipollex Seo, 2013 — Korea
- Arcuphantes longissimus Saito, 1992 — Japan
- Arcuphantes namhaensis Seo, 2006 — Korea
- Arcuphantes orbiculatus Saito, 1992 — Japan
- Arcuphantes osugiensis (Oi, 1960) — Japan
- Arcuphantes paiki Saito, 1992 — Japan
- Arcuphantes pennatoides Seo, 2018 — Korea
- Arcuphantes pennatus Paik, 1983 — Korea
- Arcuphantes pictilis Chamberlin & Ivie, 1943 — USA
- Arcuphantes potteri Chamberlin & Ivie, 1943 — USA
- Arcuphantes profundus Seo, 2013 — Korea
- Arcuphantes pulchellus Paik, 1978 — Korea
- Arcuphantes pyeongchangensis Seo, 2018 — Korea
- Arcuphantes rarus Seo, 2013 — Korea
- Arcuphantes rostratus Ono & Saito, 2001 — Japan
- Arcuphantes saragaminensis Ono & Saito, 2001 — Japan
- Arcuphantes scitulus Paik, 1974 — Korea
- Arcuphantes semiorbiculatus Jin, Ma & Tu, 2018 — USA
- Arcuphantes sylvaticus Chamberlin & Ivie, 1943 — USA
- Arcuphantes tamaensis (Oi, 1960) — Japan
- Arcuphantes trifidus Seo, 2013 — Korea
- Arcuphantes troglodytarum (Oi, 1960) — Japan
- Arcuphantes tsushimanus Ono & Saito, 2001 — Japan
- Arcuphantes uenoi Saito, 1992 — Japan
- Arcuphantes uhmi Seo & Sohn, 1997 — Korea
- Arcuphantes yamakawai (Oi, 1960) — Japan

== Ascetophantes ==
Ascetophantes Tanasevitch & Saaristo, 2006

- Ascetophantes asceticus (Tanasevitch, 1987) — Nepal

== Asemostera ==
Asemostera Simon, 1898

- Asemostera arcana (Millidge, 1991) — Costa Rica to Venezuela
- Asemostera daedalus Miller, 2007 — Costa Rica, Panama, Colombia
- Asemostera dianae Rodrigues & Brescovit, 2012 — Peru
- Asemostera enkidu Miller, 2007 — Colombia, Venezuela
- Asemostera involuta (Millidge, 1991) — Ecuador
- Asemostera janetae Miller, 2007 — Peru, Bolivia, Argentina
- Asemostera latithorax (Keyserling, 1886) (type species) — Brazil
- Asemostera pallida (Millidge, 1991) — Peru
- Asemostera tacuapi Rodrigues, 2007 — Brazil

== Asiafroneta ==
Asiafroneta Tanasevitch, 2020

- Asiafroneta atrata Tanasevitch, 2020 — Malaysia (Borneo)
- Asiafroneta pallida Tanasevitch, 2020 (type species) — Malaysia (Borneo)

== Asiagone ==
Asiagone Tanasevitch, 2014

- Asiagone komannai Tanasevitch, 2017 - Thailand
- Asiagone perforata Tanasevitch, 2014 - China, Laos
- Asiagone siama Tanasevitch, 2014 - Thailand
- Asiagone signifera Tanasevitch, 2014 (type species) - Laos

== Asiceratinops ==
Asiceratinops Eskov, 1992

- Asiceratinops amurensis (Eskov, 1992) (type species) — Russia
- Asiceratinops kolymensis (Eskov, 1992) — Russia

== Asiophantes ==
Asiophantes Eskov, 1993

- Asiophantes pacificus Eskov, 1993 (type species) — Russia
- Asiophantes sibiricus Eskov, 1993 — Russia

== Asperthorax ==
Asperthorax Oi, 1960

- Asperthorax borealis Ono & Saito, 2001 — Russia, Japan
- Asperthorax communis Oi, 1960 (type species) — Russia, Japan
- Asperthorax granularis Gao & Zhu, 1989 — China

== Asthenargellus ==
Asthenargellus Caporiacco, 1949

- Asthenargellus kastoni Caporiacco, 1949 (type species) — Kenya
- Asthenargellus meneghettii Caporiacco, 1949 — Kenya

== Asthenargoides ==
Asthenargoides Eskov, 1993

- Asthenargoides kurenstchikovi Eskov, 1993 — Russia
- Asthenargoides kurtchevae Eskov, 1993 — Russia
- Asthenargoides logunovi Eskov, 1993 (type species) — Russia

== Asthenargus ==
Asthenargus Simon & Fage, 1922

- Asthenargus adygeicus Tanasevitch, Ponomarev & Chumachenko, 2016 - Russia (Caucasus)
- Asthenargus bracianus Miller, 1938 — Central, Eastern Europe
- Asthenargus brevisetosus Miller, 1970 — Angola
- Asthenargus carpaticus Weiss, 1998 — Romania
- Asthenargus caucasicus Tanasevitch, 1987 — Russia, Central Asia
- Asthenargus conicus Tanasevitch, 2006 — China
- Asthenargus edentulus Tanasevitch, 1989 — Kazakhstan to China
- Asthenargus expallidus Holm, 1962 — Cameroon, Congo, Kenya, Tanzania
- Asthenargus helveticus Schenkel, 1936 — Switzerland to Poland
- Asthenargus inermis Simon & Fage, 1922 — East Africa
- Asthenargus linguatulus Miller, 1970 — Angola
- Asthenargus longispinus (Simon, 1914) — Spain, France
- Asthenargus major Holm, 1962 — Kenya
- Asthenargus marginatus Holm, 1962 — Uganda
- Asthenargus matsudae Saito & Ono, 2001 — Japan
- Asthenargus myrmecophilus Miller, 1970 — Angola, Nigeria
- Asthenargus niphonius Saito & Ono, 2001 — Japan
- Asthenargus paganus (Simon, 1884) (type species) — Palearctic
- Asthenargus perforatus Schenkel, 1929 — Europe
- Asthenargus placidus (Simon, 1884) — France, Switzerland
- Asthenargus thaleri Wunderlich, 1983 — Nepal

== Atypena ==
Atypena Simon, 1894

- Atypena adelinae Barrion & Litsinger, 1995 – Philippines
- Atypena cirrifrons (Heimer, 1984) – China, Laos, Thailand, Vietnam
- Atypena cracatoa (Millidge, 1995) – Krakatau
- Atypena ellioti Jocqué, 1983 – Sri Lanka
- Atypena pallida (Millidge, 1995) – Thailand
- Atypena simoni Jocqué, 1983 – Sri Lanka
- Atypena superciliosa Simon, 1894^{T} (type species) – Philippines
- Atypena thailandica Barrion & Litsinger, 1995 – Thailand

== Australolinyphia ==
Australolinyphia Wunderlich, 1976

- Australolinyphia remota Wunderlich, 1976 — Queensland

== Australophantes ==
Australophantes Tanasevitch, 2012

- Australophantes laetesiformis (Wunderlich), 1976 — Sulawesi, Queensland

== Bactrogyna ==
Bactrogyna Millidge, 1991

- Bactrogyna prominens Millidge, 1991 — Chile

== Baryphyma ==
Baryphyma Simon, 1884

- Baryphyma gowerense (Locket, 1965) — Holarctic
- Baryphyma insigne (Palmgren, 1976) — Finland
- Baryphyma maritimum (Crocker & Parker, 1970) — Europe to Central Asia
- Baryphyma pratense (Blackwall, 1861) (type species) — Europe to Belarus
- Baryphyma proclive (Simon, 1884) — Italy
- Baryphyma trifrons (O. P.-Cambridge, 1863) — Holarctic

== Baryphymula ==
Baryphymula Eskov, 1992

- Baryphymula kamakuraensis (Oi, 1960) — Japan

== Bathylinyphia ==
Bathylinyphia Eskov, 1992

- Bathylinyphia maior (Kulczynski, 1885) — Russia, Kazakhstan, China, Korea, Japan

== Bathyphantes ==
Bathyphantes Menge, 1866

- Bathyphantes alameda Ivie, 1969 — USA, Canada
- Bathyphantes alascensis (Banks, 1900) — USA, Canada, Alaska
- Bathyphantes alboventris (Banks, 1892) — USA, Canada
- Bathyphantes approximatus (O. P.-Cambridge, 1871) — Palearctic
- Bathyphantes bishopi Ivie, 1969 — USA
- Bathyphantes bohuensis Zhu & Zhou, 1983 — China
- Bathyphantes brevipes (Emerton, 1917) — USA, Canada, Alaska
- Bathyphantes brevis (Emerton, 1911) — USA, Canada, Alaska
- Bathyphantes canadensis (Emerton, 1882) — Russia, Alaska, Canada, USA
- Bathyphantes chico Ivie, 1969 — USA
- Bathyphantes diasosnemis Fage, 1929 — USA
- Bathyphantes dubius Locket, 1968 — Angola
- Bathyphantes eumenis (L. Koch, 1879) — Holarctic
  - Bathyphantes eumenis buchari Ruzicka, 1988 — Central Europe
- Bathyphantes fissidens Simon, 1902 — Argentina
- Bathyphantes floralis Tu & Li, 2006 — Vietnam
- Bathyphantes glacialis Caporiacco, 1935 — Karakorum
- Bathyphantes gracilipes van Helsdingen, 1977 — St. Helena
- Bathyphantes gracilis (Blackwall, 1841) (type species) — Holarctic
- Bathyphantes gulkana Ivie, 1969 — Russia, Alaska
- Bathyphantes helenae van Helsdingen, 1977 — St. Helena
- Bathyphantes hirsutus Locket, 1968 — Congo
- Bathyphantes humilis (L. Koch, 1879) — Russia
- Bathyphantes iviei Holm, 1970 — Alaska
- Bathyphantes jeniseicus Eskov, 1979 — Finland, Russia
- Bathyphantes keeni (Emerton, 1917) — Alaska, Canada, USA
- Bathyphantes larvarum Caporiacco, 1935 — Karakorum
- Bathyphantes latescens (Chamberlin, 1919) — USA
- Bathyphantes lennoxensis Simon, 1902 — Argentina
- Bathyphantes mainlingensis Hu, 2001 — China
- Bathyphantes malkini Ivie, 1969 — USA, Canada
- Bathyphantes menyuanensis Hu, 2001 — China
- Bathyphantes minor Millidge & Russell-Smith, 1992 — Borneo
- Bathyphantes montanus Rainbow, 1912 — Queensland
- Bathyphantes nangqianensis Hu, 2001 — China
- Bathyphantes nigrinus (Westring, 1851) — Palearctic
- Bathyphantes ohlerti Simon, 1884 — Poland
- Bathyphantes orica Ivie, 1969 — USA, Canada
- Bathyphantes pallidus (Banks, 1892) — USA, Canada, Alaska
- Bathyphantes paracymbialis Tanasevitch, 2014 - China, Laos, Thailand, Malaysia
- Bathyphantes paradoxus Berland, 1929 — Samoa
- Bathyphantes parvulus (Westring, 1851) — Palearctic
- Bathyphantes pogonias Kulczynski, 1885 — Russia, Alaska
- Bathyphantes rainbowi Roewer, 1942 — Lord Howe Islands
- Bathyphantes reprobus (Kulczynski, 1916) — Holarctic
- Bathyphantes reticularis Caporiacco, 1935 — Karakorum
- Bathyphantes robustus Oi, 1960 — Korea, Japan
- Bathyphantes sarasini Berland, 1924 — New Caledonia
- Bathyphantes setiger F. O. P.-Cambridge, 1894 — Palearctic
- Bathyphantes similis Kulczynski, 1894 — Europe, Turkey
- Bathyphantes tagalogensis Barrion & Litsinger, 1995 — Philippines
- Bathyphantes tongluensis Chen & Song, 1988 — China
- Bathyphantes umiatus Ivie, 1969 — Alaska
- Bathyphantes vittiger Simon, 1884 — France
- Bathyphantes waneta Ivie, 1969 — USA, Canada
- Bathyphantes weyeri (Emerton, 1875) — USA
- Bathyphantes yodoensis Oi, 1960 — Japan
- Bathyphantes yukon Ivie, 1969 — Alaska

== Batueta ==
Batueta Locket, 1982

- Batueta baculum Tanasevitch, 2014 - Thailand, Malaysia
- Batueta cuspidata Zhao & Li, 2014 - China
- Batueta similis Wunderlich & Song, 1995 — China
- Batueta voluta Locket, 1982 (type species) — Malaysia

== Bifurcia ==
Bifurcia Saaristo, Tu & Li, 2006

- Bifurcia cucurbita Zhai & Zhu, 2007 — China
- Bifurcia curvata (Sha & Zhu, 1987) — China
- Bifurcia maritima (Tanasevitch, 2010) - Russia (Far East)
- Bifurcia oligerae Marusik, Omelko & Koponen, 2016 - Russia (Far East)
- Bifurcia pseudosongi Quan & Chen, 2012 — China
- Bifurcia ramosa (Li & Zhu, 1987) (type species) — China
- Bifurcia songi Zhai & Zhu, 2007 — China
- Bifurcia tanasevitchi Marusik, Omelko & Koponen, 2016 - Russia (Far East)

== Birgerius ==
Birgerius Saaristo, 1973

- Birgerius microps (Simon, 1911) — France, Spain

== Bisetifer ==
Bisetifer Tanasevitch, 1987

- Bisetifer cephalotus Tanasevitch, 1987 (type species) — Russia, Central Asia
- Bisetifer gruzin Tanasevitch, Ponomarev & Chumachenko, 2015 - Russia, Georgia, Azerbaijan

== Bishopiana ==
Bishopiana Eskov, 1988

- Bishopiana glumacea (Gao, Fei & Zhu, 1992) — China
- Bishopiana hypoarctica Eskov, 1988 (type species) — Russia

== Blestia ==
Blestia Millidge, 1993

- Blestia sarcocuon (Crosby & Bishop, 1927) — USA

== Bolephthyphantes ==
Bolephthyphantes Strand, 1901

- Bolephthyphantes caucasicus (Tanasevitch, 1990) — Czech Republic, Russia
- Bolephthyphantes index (Thorell, 1856) (type species) — Greenland, Palearctic
- Bolephthyphantes indexoides (Tanasevitch, 1989) — Central Asia

== Bolyphantes ==
Bolyphantes C. L. Koch, 1837

- Bolyphantes alticeps (Sundevall, 1833) — Palearctic
- Bolyphantes bipartitus (Tanasevitch, 1989) — Kyrgyzstan
- Bolyphantes distichoides Tanasevitch, 2000 — Russia
- Bolyphantes distichus (Tanasevitch, 1986) — Russia, Kazakhstan
- Bolyphantes elburzensis Tanasevitch, 2009 — Iran
- Bolyphantes kilpisjaerviensis Palmgren, 1975 — Finland
- Bolyphantes kolosvaryi (Caporiacco, 1936) — Switzerland, Italy, Balkans
- Bolyphantes lagodekhensis (Tanasevitch, 1990) — Georgia
- Bolyphantes lamellaris Tanasevitch, 1990 — Italy, Greece, Russia
- Bolyphantes luteolus (Blackwall, 1833) (type species) — Palearctic
- Bolyphantes mongolicus Loksa, 1965 — Mongolia
- Bolyphantes nigropictus Simon, 1884 — Western Mediterranean
- Bolyphantes punctulatus (Holm, 1939) — Scandinavia, Russia
- Bolyphantes sacer (Tanasevitch, 1986) — Kyrgyzstan
- Bolyphantes severtzovi Tanasevitch, 1989 — Central Asia
- Bolyphantes subtiliseta Tanasevitch, 2019 — France (Corsica)
- Bolyphantes supremus (Tanasevitch, 1986) — Kyrgyzstan

== Bordea ==
Bordea Bosmans, 1995

- Bordea berlandi (Fage, 1931) — Portugal
- Bordea cavicola (Simon, 1884) (type species) — Spain, France
- Bordea negrei (Dresco, 1951) — Spain, France

== Brachycerasphora ==
Brachycerasphora Denis, 1962

- Brachycerasphora connectens Denis, 1964 — Libya
- Brachycerasphora convexa (Simon, 1884) — Algeria, Tunisia
- Brachycerasphora femoralis (O. P.-Cambridge, 1872) — Israel
- Brachycerasphora monocerotum Denis, 1962 (type species) — Libya
- Brachycerasphora parvicornis (Simon, 1884) — Egypt

== Bursellia ==
Bursellia Holm, 1962

- Bursellia cameroonensis Bosmans & Jocque, 1983 — Cameroon
- Bursellia comata Holm, 1962 — Congo, Uganda
  - Bursellia comata kivuensis Holm, 1964 — Congo
- Bursellia gibbicervix (Denis, 1962) — Tanzania
- Bursellia glabra Holm, 1962 (type species) — Congo, Kenya
- Bursellia holmi Bosmans, 1977 — Kenya
- Bursellia paghi Jocque & Scharff, 1986 — Tanzania
- Bursellia setifera (Denis, 1962) — Cameroon, Congo, Kenya, Tanzania, Malawi
- Bursellia unicornis Bosmans, 1988 — Cameroon

== Caenonetria ==
Caenonetria Millidge & Russell-Smith, 1992

- Caenonetria perdita Millidge & Russell-Smith, 1992 — Borneo

== Callitrichia ==
Callitrichia Fage, 1936

- Callitrichia afromontana Scharff, 1990 — Tanzania
- Callitrichia aliena Holm, 1962 — Algeria, Cameroon, Kenya
- Callitrichia cacuminata Holm, 1962 — Kenya, Uganda
- Callitrichia crinigera Scharff, 1990 — Tanzania
- Callitrichia formosana Oi, 1977 — Bangladesh to Japan
- Callitrichia glabriceps Holm, 1962 — Kenya, Uganda
- Callitrichia hamifera Fage, 1936 (type species) — Kenya, Uganda
- Callitrichia inacuminata Bosmans, 1977 — Kenya
- Callitrichia incerta Miller, 1970 — Angola
- Callitrichia kenyae Fage, 1936 — Kenya
- Callitrichia marakweti Fage, 1936 — Kenya
- Callitrichia meruensis Holm, 1962 — Tanzania
- Callitrichia mira (Jocque & Scharff, 1986) — Tanzania
- Callitrichia monticola (Tullgren, 1910) — Tanzania
- Callitrichia obtusifrons Miller, 1970 — Angola
- Callitrichia paludicola Holm, 1962 — Tanzania
- Callitrichia pileata (Jocque & Scharff, 1986) — Tanzania
- Callitrichia pilosa (Jocque & Scharff, 1986) — Tanzania
- Callitrichia ruwenzoriensis Holm, 1962 — Uganda
- Callitrichia sellafrontis Scharff, 1990 — Tanzania
- Callitrichia silvatica Holm, 1962 — Kenya, Uganda, Malawi
- Callitrichia simplex (Jocque & Scharff, 1986) — Tanzania
- Callitrichia taeniata Holm, 1968 — Tanzania
- Callitrichia turrita Holm, 1962 — Tanzania

== Callosa ==
Callosa Zhao & Li, 2017

- Callosa baiseensis Zhao & Li, 2017 — China
- Callosa ciliata Zhao & Li, 2017 — China

== Camafroneta ==
Camafroneta Frick & Scharff, 2018

- Camafroneta oku Frick & Scharff, 2018 — Cameroon

== Cameroneta ==
Cameroneta Bosmans & Jocque, 1983

- Cameroneta longiradix Bosmans & Jocque, 1983 — Cameroon

== Canariellanum ==
Canariellanum Wunderlich, 1987

- Canariellanum albidum Wunderlich, 1987 — Canary Islands
- Canariellanum arborense Wunderlich, 1987 (type species) — Canary Islands
- Canariellanum hierroense Wunderlich, 1992 — Canary Islands
- Canariellanum palmense Wunderlich, 1987 — Canary Islands

== Canariphantes ==
Canariphantes Wunderlich, 1992

- Canariphantes acoreensis (Wunderlich, 1992) - Azores
- Canariphantes alpicola Wunderlich, 1992 type species — Canary Islands
- Canariphantes atlassahariensis (Bosmans, 1991) — Algeria
- Canariphantes epigynatus Tanasevitch, 2013 — Israel
- Canariphantes junipericola Crespo & Bosmans, 2014
- Canariphantes naili (Bosmans & Bouragba, 1992) — Algeria
- Canariphantes nanus (Kulczynski, 1898) — Central, Eastern Europe, Ukraine, Russia, Israel
- Canariphantes palmaensis Wunderlich, 2011 — Canary Islands
- Canariphantes relictus Crespo & Bosmans, 2014 - Azores
- Canariphantes tenerrimus (Simon, 1929) - Portugal, Spain, France, Greece, Algeria, Morocco
- Canariphantes zonatus (Simon, 1884) — Portugal, France, Algeria, Morocco, Tunisia
  - Canariphantes zonatus lucifugus (Simon, 1929) — France

== Capsulia ==
Capsulia Saaristo, Tu & Li, 2006

- Capsulia laciniosa Zhao & Li, 2014 - China
- Capsulia tianmushana (Chen & Song, 1987) (type species) — China

== Caracladus ==
Caracladus Simon, 1884

- Caracladus avicula (L. Koch, 1869) (type species) — France, Switzerland, Germany, Austria, Italy
- Caracladus leberti (Roewer, 1942) — Western, Central Europe
- Caracladus montanus Sha & Zhu, 1994 — China
- Caracladus tsurusakii Saito, 1988 — Japan
- Caracladus zamoniensis Frick & Muff, 2009 — France, Switzerland, Austria

== Carorita ==
Carorita Duffey & Merrett, 1963

- Carorita limnaea (Crosby & Bishop, 1927) (type species) — Holarctic
- Carorita sibirica Tanasevitch, 2007 — Russia

== Cassafroneta ==
Cassafroneta Blest, 1979

- Cassafroneta forsteri Blest, 1979 — New Zealand

== Catacercus ==
Catacercus Millidge, 1985

- Catacercus fuegianus (Tullgren, 1901) — Chile

== Catonetria ==
Catonetria Millidge & Ashmole, 1994

- Catonetria caeca Millidge & Ashmole, 1994 — Ascension Island

== Caucasopisthes ==
Caucasopisthes Tanasevitch, 1990

- Caucasopisthes procurvus (Tanasevitch, 1987) — Russia, Georgia

== Cautinella ==
Cautinella Millidge, 1985

- Cautinella minuta Millidge, 1985 — Chile

== Caviphantes ==
Caviphantes Oi, 1960

- Caviphantes dobrogicus (Dumitrescu & Miller, 1962) — Romania to Central Asia
- Caviphantes flagellatus (Zhu & Zhou, 1992) — China
- Caviphantes pseudosaxetorum Wunderlich, 1979 — Lebanon to India, Nepal, China, Russia, Japan
- Caviphantes samensis Oi, 1960 (type species) — China, Japan
- Caviphantes saxetorum (Hull, 1916) — Holarctic

== Centromerita ==
Centromerita Dahl, 1912

- Centromerita bicolor (Blackwall, 1833) (type species) — Palearctic, Canada
- Centromerita concinna (Thorell, 1875) — Palearctic

== Centromerus ==
Centromerus Dahl, 1886

- Centromerus abditus Gnelitsa, 2007 — Ukraine, Russia
- Centromerus acutidentatus Deltshev, 2002 — Yugoslavia
- Centromerus albidus Simon, 1929 — Europe
- Centromerus amurensis Eskov & Marusik, 1992 — Russia
- Centromerus andrei Dresco, 1952 — Spain
- Centromerus andriescui Weiss, 1987 — Romania
- Centromerus anoculus Wunderlich, 1995 — Madeira
- Centromerus arcanus (O. P.-Cambridge, 1873) — Palearctic
- Centromerus balazuci Dresco, 1952 — France
- Centromerus bonaeviae Brignoli, 1979 — Sardinia
- Centromerus brevipalpus (Menge, 1866) (type species) — Palearctic
- Centromerus bulgarianus (Drensky, 1931) — Bulgaria
- Centromerus capucinus (Simon, 1884) — Europe, Russia
- Centromerus cavernarum (L. Koch, 1872) — Europe
- Centromerus chappuisi Fage, 1931 — Romania
- Centromerus cinctus (Simon, 1884) — Corsica, Algeria, Tunisia
- Centromerus clarus (L. Koch, 1879) — Russia
- Centromerus cornupalpis (O. P.-Cambridge, 1875) — USA, Canada
- Centromerus corsicus (Simon, 1910) - Corsica
- Centromerus cottarellii Brignoli, 1979 — Italy
- Centromerus dacicus Dumitrescu & Georgescu, 1980 — Romania, Serbia
- Centromerus denticulatus (Emerton, 1909) — USA
- Centromerus desmeti Bosmans, 1986 — Morocco, Algeria
- Centromerus dilutus (O. P.-Cambridge, 1875) — Europe, Russia
- Centromerus europaeus (Simon, 1911) — Portugal, Spain, France, Algeria, Balkans
- Centromerus fuerteventurensis Wunderlich, 1992 — Canary Islands
- Centromerus furcatus (Emerton, 1882) — USA, Canada
- Centromerus gatoi Ballarin & Pantini, 2020 — Italy
- Centromerus gentilis Dumitrescu & Georgescu, 1980 — Romania
- Centromerus hanseni Ballarin & Pantini, 2020 — Italy
- Centromerus ictericus (Simon, 1929) - France
- Centromerus incilium (L. Koch, 1881) — Palearctic
- Centromerus isaiai Bosmans, 2015 - Corsica, Sardinia
- Centromerus lakatnikensis (Drensky, 1931) — Bulgaria
- Centromerus latidens (Emerton, 1882) — USA, Canada
- Centromerus laziensis Hu, 2001 — China
- Centromerus leruthi Fage, 1933 — Europe
- Centromerus levitarsis (Simon, 1884) — Palearctic
- Centromerus longibulbus (Emerton, 1882) — USA
- Centromerus marciai Bosmans & Gasparo, 2015 - Sardinia
- Centromerus milleri Deltshev, 1974 — Bulgaria
- Centromerus minor Tanasevitch, 1990 — Turkey, Russia, Central Asia
- Centromerus minutissimus Merrett & Powell, 1993 — England, Germany
- Centromerus nurgush Tanasevitch & Esyunin, 2013 — Russia
- Centromerus obenbergeri Kratochvil & Miller, 1938 — Montenegro
- Centromerus obscurus Bösenberg, 1902 — Central Europe
- Centromerus pabulator (O. P.-Cambridge, 1875) — Europe, Russia
- Centromerus pacificus Eskov & Marusik, 1992 — Russia
- Centromerus paradoxus (Simon, 1884) — Western Mediterranean
- Centromerus pasquinii Brignoli, 1971 — Italy
- Centromerus persimilis (O. P.-Cambridge, 1912) — Europe, Russia
- Centromerus persolutus (O. P.-Cambridge, 1875) — USA, Canada
- Centromerus phoceorum Simon, 1929 — Portugal, Spain, France, Algeria, Tunisia
- Centromerus piccolo Weiss, 1996 — Germany
- Centromerus ponsi Lissner, 2016 - Spain (Balearic Isles)
- Centromerus pratensis Gnelitsa & Ponomarev, 2010 — Russia
- Centromerus prudens (O. P.-Cambridge, 1873) — Palearctic
  - Centromerus prudens electus (Simon, 1884) — France
- Centromerus puddui Brignoli, 1979 — Sardinia
- Centromerus qinghaiensis Hu, 2001 — China
- Centromerus qingzangensis Hu, 2001 — China
- Centromerus remotus Roewer, 1938 — Moluccas
- Centromerus satyrus (Simon, 1884) — France
- Centromerus sellarius (Simon, 1884) — Europe
- Centromerus semiater (L. Koch, 1879) — Palearctic
- Centromerus serbicus Deltshev, 2002 — Yugoslavia
- Centromerus serratus (O. P.-Cambridge, 1875) — Europe
- Centromerus setosus Miller & Kratochvil, 1940 — Slovakia
- Centromerus sexoculatus Wunderlich, 1992 — Madeira
- Centromerus silvicola (Kulczynski, 1887) — Central Europe to Russia
- Centromerus sinuatus Bosmans, 1986 — Morocco, Algeria, Tunisia
- Centromerus sinus (Simon, 1884) — France
- Centromerus subalpinus Lessert, 1907 — Switzerland, Germany, Austria
- Centromerus subcaecus Kulczynski, 1914 — Europe
- Centromerus succinus (Simon, 1884) — Western Mediterranean
- Centromerus sylvaticus (Blackwall, 1841) — Holarctic
  - Centromerus sylvaticus paucidentatus Deltshev, 1983 — Bulgaria
- Centromerus tennapex (Barrows, 1940) — USA
- Centromerus terrigenus Yaginuma, 1972 — Russia, Japan
- Centromerus timidus (Simon, 1884) — Spain, Romania
- Centromerus tongiorgii Ballarin & Pantini, 2020 — Italy
- Centromerus tridentinus Caporiacco, 1952 — Italy
- Centromerus trilobus Tao, Li & Zhu, 1995 — China
- Centromerus truki Millidge, 1991 — Caroline Islands
- Centromerus turcicus Wunderlich, 1995 — Turkey
- Centromerus unicolor Roewer, 1959 — Turkey
- Centromerus ussuricus Eskov & Marusik, 1992 — Russia
- Centromerus valkanovi Deltshev, 1983 — Bulgaria
- Centromerus variegatus Denis, 1962 — Madeira

== Centrophantes ==
Centrophantes Miller & Polenec, 1975

- Centrophantes crosbyi (Fage & Kratochvil, 1933) (type species) — Europe
- Centrophantes roeweri (Wiehle, 1961) — Central Europe

== Ceraticelus ==
Ceraticelus Simon, 1884

- Ceraticelus agathus Chamberlin, 1949 — USA
- Ceraticelus albus (Fox, 1891) — USA
- Ceraticelus alticeps (Fox, 1891) — USA
- Ceraticelus artemisiae Prentice & Redak, 2009 — USA
- Ceraticelus atriceps (O. P.-Cambridge, 1874) — USA
- Ceraticelus berthoudi Dondale, 1958 — USA
- Ceraticelus bryantae Kaston, 1945 — USA
- Ceraticelus bulbosus (Emerton, 1882) — Holarctic
- Ceraticelus carinatus (Emerton, 1911) — USA
- Ceraticelus crassiceps Chamberlin & Ivie, 1939 — USA
- Ceraticelus creolus Chamberlin, 1925 — USA
- Ceraticelus emertoni (O. P.-Cambridge, 1874) — USA
- Ceraticelus fastidiosus Crosby & Bishop, 1925 — USA
- Ceraticelus fissiceps (O. P.-Cambridge, 1874) (type species) — USA, Canada
- Ceraticelus innominabilis Crosby, 1905 — Alaska
- Ceraticelus laetabilis (O. P.-Cambridge, 1874) — USA, Canada
  - Ceraticelus laetabilis pisga Chamberlin, 1949 — USA
- Ceraticelus laetus (O. P.-Cambridge, 1874) — USA, Canada
- Ceraticelus laticeps (Emerton, 1894) — USA, Canada
  - Ceraticelus laticeps bucephalus Chamberlin & Ivie, 1944 — USA
- Ceraticelus limnologicus Crosby & Bishop, 1925 — USA
- Ceraticelus micropalpis (Emerton, 1882) — USA
- Ceraticelus minutus (Emerton, 1882) — USA, Canada
- Ceraticelus nigripes Bryant, 1940 — Cuba
- Ceraticelus orientalis Eskov, 1987 — Russia
- Ceraticelus paludigena Crosby & Bishop, 1925 — USA, Hispaniola
- Ceraticelus paschalis Crosby & Bishop, 1925 — USA
- Ceraticelus phylax Ivie & Barrows, 1935 — USA
- Ceraticelus pygmaeus (Emerton, 1882) — USA
- Ceraticelus rowensis Levi & Levi, 1955 — Canada
- Ceraticelus savannus Chamberlin & Ivie, 1944 — USA
- Ceraticelus silus Dondale, 1958 — Alaska
- Ceraticelus similis (Banks, 1892) — USA
- Ceraticelus subniger Chamberlin, 1949 — USA
- Ceraticelus tibialis (Fox, 1891) — USA
- Ceraticelus tumidus Bryant, 1940 — Cuba

== Ceratinella ==
Ceratinella Emerton, 1882

- Ceratinella acerea Chamberlin & Ivie, 1933 — USA
- Ceratinella alaskae Chamberlin & Ivie, 1947 — Russia, Alaska, Canada, USA
- Ceratinella apollonii Caporiacco, 1938 — Italy
- Ceratinella brevipes (Westring, 1851) — Palearctic
- Ceratinella brevis (Wider, 1834) (type species) — Palearctic
- Ceratinella brunnea Emerton, 1882 — USA, Canada, Alaska
- Ceratinella buna Chamberlin, 1949 — USA
- Ceratinella diversa Chamberlin, 1949 — USA
- Ceratinella fumifera Saito, 1939 — Japan
- Ceratinella hemetha Chamberlin, 1949 — USA
- Ceratinella holocerea Chamberlin, 1949 — USA
- Ceratinella kenaba Chamberlin, 1949 — USA
- Ceratinella kurenshchikovi Marusik & Gnelitsa, 2009 — Russia
- Ceratinella major Kulczynski, 1894 — Palearctic
- Ceratinella ornatula (Crosby & Bishop, 1925) — USA, Canada, Alaska, Greenland
  - Ceratinella ornatula alaskana Chamberlin, 1949 — Alaska
- Ceratinella parvula (Fox, 1891) — USA
- Ceratinella plancyi (Simon, 1880) — China
- Ceratinella playa Cokendolpher et al., 2007 — USA
- Ceratinella rosea Oliger, 1985 — Russia
- Ceratinella scabrosa (O. P.-Cambridge, 1871) — Palearctic
- Ceratinella sibirica Strand, 1903 — Russia
- Ceratinella subulata Bösenberg & Strand, 1906 — Japan
- Ceratinella sydneyensis Wunderlich, 1976 — New South Wales
- Ceratinella tigana Chamberlin, 1949 — Alaska
- Ceratinella tosior Chamberlin, 1949 — USA
- Ceratinella wideri (Thorell, 1871) — Palearctic

== Ceratinops ==
Ceratinops Banks, 1905

- Ceratinops annulipes (Banks, 1892) (type species) — USA
- Ceratinops carolinus (Banks, 1911) — USA
- Ceratinops crenatus (Emerton, 1882) — USA
- Ceratinops inflatus (Emerton, 1923) — USA
- Ceratinops latus (Emerton, 1882) — USA
- Ceratinops littoralis (Emerton, 1913) — USA
- Ceratinops obscurus (Chamberlin & Ivie, 1939) — USA
- Ceratinops rugosus (Emerton, 1909) — USA
- Ceratinops sylvaticus (Emerton, 1913) — USA, Canada
- Ceratinops uintanus Chamberlin, 1949 — USA

== Ceratinopsidis ==
Ceratinopsidis Bishop & Crosby, 1930

- Ceratinopsidis formosa (Banks, 1892) — USA

== Ceratinopsis ==
Ceratinopsis Emerton, 1882

- Ceratinopsis acripes (Denis, 1962) — Madeira
- Ceratinopsis africana (Holm, 1962) — Gabon, Kenya
- Ceratinopsis atolma Chamberlin, 1925 — USA
- Ceratinopsis auriculata Emerton, 1909 — USA, Canada
- Ceratinopsis benoiti (Holm, 1968) — Tanzania
- Ceratinopsis bicolor Banks, 1896 — USA
- Ceratinopsis blesti Locket, 1982 — Malaysia
- Ceratinopsis bona Chamberlin & Ivie, 1944 — USA
- Ceratinopsis crosbyi Chamberlin, 1949 — USA
- Ceratinopsis delicata Chamberlin & Ivie, 1939 — USA
- Ceratinopsis dippenaari Jocque, 1984 — South Africa
- Ceratinopsis disparata (Dondale, 1959) — USA
- Ceratinopsis fako Bosmans & Jocque, 1983 — Cameroon
- Ceratinopsis georgiana Chamberlin & Ivie, 1944 — USA
- Ceratinopsis gosibia Chamberlin, 1949 — USA
- Ceratinopsis guerrerensis Gertsch & Davis, 1937 — Mexico
- Ceratinopsis holmi Jocque, 1981 — Malawi, Tanzania
- Ceratinopsis idanrensis Locket & Russell-Smith, 1980 — Nigeria, Botswana
- Ceratinopsis infuscata (Denis, 1962) — Madeira
- Ceratinopsis interpres (O. P.-Cambridge, 1874) (type species) — USA
- Ceratinopsis interventa Chamberlin, 1949 — USA
- Ceratinopsis labradorensis Emerton, 1925 — Canada
- Ceratinopsis laticeps Emerton, 1882 — USA
- Ceratinopsis locketi Millidge, 1995 — Krakatau
- Ceratinopsis machadoi (Miller, 1970) — Nigeria, Angola
- Ceratinopsis mbamensis Bosmans, 1988 — Cameroon
- Ceratinopsis monticola (Simon, 1894) — Sri Lanka
- Ceratinopsis munda (O. P.-Cambridge, 1896) — Guatemala
- Ceratinopsis nigriceps Emerton, 1882 — USA, Canada
- Ceratinopsis nigripalpis Emerton, 1882 — USA, Canada
- Ceratinopsis nitida (Holm, 1964) — Cameroon, Congo
- Ceratinopsis oregonicola Chamberlin, 1949 — USA
- Ceratinopsis orientalis Locket, 1982 — Malaysia
- Ceratinopsis palomara Chamberlin, 1949 — USA
- Ceratinopsis raboeli Scharff, 1989 — Kenya
- Ceratinopsis rosea Banks, 1898 — Mexico
- Ceratinopsis ruberrima Franganillo, 1926 — Cuba
- Ceratinopsis secuta Chamberlin, 1949 — USA
- Ceratinopsis setoensis (Oi, 1960) — Korea, Japan
- Ceratinopsis sinuata Bosmans, 1988 — Cameroon
- Ceratinopsis sutoris Bishop & Crosby, 1930 — USA, Canada
- Ceratinopsis swanea Chamberlin & Ivie, 1944 — USA
- Ceratinopsis sylvania Chamberlin & Ivie, 1944 — USA
- Ceratinopsis watsinga Chamberlin, 1949 — USA
- Ceratinopsis xanthippe (Keyserling, 1886) — USA
- Ceratinopsis yola Chamberlin & Ivie, 1939 — USA

== Ceratocyba ==
Ceratocyba Holm, 1962

- Ceratocyba umbilicaris Holm, 1962 — Kenya

== Cheniseo ==
Cheniseo Bishop & Crosby, 1935

- Cheniseo fabulosa Bishop & Crosby, 1935 (type species) — USA
- Cheniseo faceta Bishop & Crosby, 1935 — USA
- Cheniseo recurvata (Banks, 1900) — Alaska
- Cheniseo sphagnicultor Bishop & Crosby, 1935 — USA, Canada

== Chenisides ==
Chenisides Denis, 1962

- Chenisides bispinigera Denis, 1962 (type species) — Congo
- Chenisides monospina Russell-Smith & Jocque, 1986 — Kenya

== Cherserigone ==
Cherserigone Denis, 1954

- Cherserigone gracilipes Denis, 1954 — Algeria

== Chiangmaia ==
Chiangmaia Millidge, 1995

- Chiangmaia rufula Millidge, 1995 — Thailand
- Chiangmaia sawetamali Millidge, 1995 (type species) — Thailand

== Chthiononetes ==
Chthiononetes Millidge, 1993

- Chthiononetes tenuis Millidge, 1993 — Western Australia

== Cinetata ==
Cinetata Wunderlich, 1995

- Cinetata gradata (Simon, 1881) — Europe

== Cirrosus ==
Cirrosus Zhao & Li, 2014

- Cirrosus atrocaudatus Zhao & Li, 2014 - China

== Claviphantes ==
Claviphantes Tanasevitch & Saaristo, 2006

- Claviphantes bifurcatoides (Tanasevitch, 1987) — Nepal
- Claviphantes bifurcatus (Tanasevitch, 1987) (type species) — Nepal

== Cnephalocotes ==
Cnephalocotes Simon, 1884

- Cnephalocotes ferrugineus Seo, 2018 — Korea
- Cnephalocotes obscurus (Blackwall, 1834) (type species) — Palearctic
- Cnephalocotes simpliciceps Simon, 1900 — Hawaii
- Cnephalocotes tristis Denis, 1954 — France

== Collinsia ==
Collinsia O. P.-Cambridge, 1913

- Collinsia borea (L. Koch, 1879) — Russia, Alaska
- Collinsia caliginosa (L. Koch, 1879) — Russia, Central Asia
  - Collinsia caliginosa nemenziana Thaler, 1980 — Austria
- Collinsia clypiella (Chamberlin, 1920) — USA
- Collinsia crassipalpis (Caporiacco, 1935) — India
- Collinsia dentata Eskov, 1990 — Russia
- Collinsia despaxi (Denis, 1950) — France
- Collinsia distincta (Simon, 1884) (type species) — Palearctic
- Collinsia ezoensis (Saito, 1986) — Japan
- Collinsia hibernica (Simon, 1926) — France
- Collinsia holmgreni (Thorell, 1871) — Holarctic
- Collinsia holmi Eskov, 1990 — Russia
- Collinsia inerrans (O. P.-Cambridge, 1885) — Palearctic
- Collinsia ksenia (Crosby & Bishop, 1928) — USA, Canada, Alaska
- Collinsia oatimpa (Chamberlin, 1949) — USA
- Collinsia oxypaederotipus (Crosby, 1905) — USA
- Collinsia palmeni Hackman, 1954 — Canada
- Collinsia perplexa (Keyserling, 1886) — USA
- Collinsia pertinens (O. P.-Cambridge, 1875) — USA
- Collinsia plumosa (Emerton, 1882) — USA, Canada
- Collinsia probata (O. P.-Cambridge, 1874) — USA
- Collinsia sachalinensis Eskov, 1990 — Russia, Japan
- Collinsia spetsbergensis (Thorell, 1871) — Holarctic
- Collinsia stylifera (Chamberlin, 1949) — USA, Canada, Alaska
- Collinsia thulensis (Jackson, 1934) — Alaska, Canada, Greenland, Spitsbergen
- Collinsia tianschanica Tanasevitch, 1989 — Kyrgyzstan

== Coloncus ==
Coloncus Chamberlin, 1949

- Coloncus americanus (Chamberlin & Ivie, 1944) — USA
- Coloncus cascadeus Chamberlin, 1949 — USA
- Coloncus ocala Chamberlin, 1949 — USA
- Coloncus pius Chamberlin, 1949 (type species) — USA
- Coloncus siou Chamberlin, 1949 — USA, Canada

== Comorella ==
Comorella Jocque, 1985

- Comorella spectabilis Jocque, 1985 — Comoro Islands

== Concavocephalus ==
Concavocephalus Eskov, 1989

- Concavocephalus eskovi Marusik & Tanasevitch, 2003 — Russia
- Concavocephalus rubens Eskov, 1989 (type species) — Russia

== Conglin ==
Conglin Zhao & Li, 2014

- Conglin personatus Zhao & Li, 2014 - China

== Connithorax ==
Connithorax Eskov, 1993

- Connithorax barbatus (Eskov, 1988) — Russia

== Coreorgonal ==
Coreorgonal Bishop & Crosby, 1935

- Coreorgonal bicornis (Emerton, 1923) (type species) — USA, Canada
- Coreorgonal monoceros (Keyserling, 1884) — USA
- Coreorgonal petulcus (Millidge, 1981) — USA

== Cornicephalus ==
Cornicephalus Saaristo & Wunderlich, 1995

- Cornicephalus jilinensis Saaristo & Wunderlich, 1995 — China

== Cresmatoneta ==
Cresmatoneta Simon, 1929

- Cresmatoneta leucophthalma (Fage, 1946) — India
- Cresmatoneta mutinensis (Canestrini, 1868) (type species) — Palearctic
- Cresmatoneta nipponensis Saito, 1988 — Korea, Japan

== Crispiphantes ==
Crispiphantes Tanasevitch, 1992

- Crispiphantes biseulsanensis (Paik, 1985) — China, Korea
- Crispiphantes rhomboideus (Paik, 1985) (type species) — Russia, Korea

== Crosbyarachne ==
Crosbyarachne Charitonov, 1937

- Crosbyarachne bukovskyi Charitonov, 1937 (type species) — Turkey, Ukraine
- Crosbyarachne silvestris (Georgescu, 1973) — Italy, Austria, Romania, Slovenia, Bulgaria

== Crosbylonia ==
Crosbylonia Eskov, 1988

- Crosbylonia borealis Eskov, 1988 — Russia

== Cryptolinyphia ==
Cryptolinyphia Millidge, 1991

- Cryptolinyphia sola Millidge, 1991 — Colombia

== Ctenophysis ==
Ctenophysis Millidge, 1985

- Ctenophysis chilensis Millidge, 1985 — Chile

== Curtimeticus ==
Curtimeticus Zhao & Li, 2014

- Curtimeticus nebulosus Zhao & Li, 2014 - China

== Cyphonetria ==
Cyphonetria Millidge, 1995

- Cyphonetria thaia Millidge, 1995 — Thailand

== Dactylopisthes ==
Dactylopisthes Simon, 1884

- Dactylopisthes digiticeps (Simon, 1881) (type species) — Europe to Israel, Iran, Afghanistan
- Dactylopisthes diphyus (Heimer, 1987) — Mongolia, China
- Dactylopisthes dongnai Tanasevitch, 2018 — Vietnam
- Dactylopisthes khatipara Tanasevitch, 2017 — Russia (Caucasus)
- Dactylopisthes locketi (Tanasevitch, 1983) — Central Asia
- Dactylopisthes marginalis Tanasevitch, 2018 — Thailand
- Dactylopisthes mirabilis (Tanasevitch, 1985) — Kyrgyzstan
- Dactylopisthes mirificus (Georgescu, 1976) — Romania, Russia, Ukraine
- Dactylopisthes separatus Zhao & Li, 2014 - China
- Dactylopisthes video (Chamberlin & Ivie, 1947) — Russia, Mongolia, Alaska, Canada

== Dactylopisthoides ==
Dactylopisthoides Eskov, 1990

- Dactylopisthoides hyperboreus Eskov, 1990 — Russia

== Decipiphantes ==
Decipiphantes Saaristo & Tanasevitch, 1996

- Decipiphantes decipiens (L. Koch, 1879) — Finland, Russia, Mongolia

== Deelemania ==
Deelemania Jocque & Bosmans, 1983

- Deelemania gabonensis Jocque, 1983 — Gabon
- Deelemania malawiensis Jocque & Russell-Smith, 1984 — Malawi
- Deelemania manensis Jocque & Bosmans, 1983 (type species) — Ivory Coast
- Deelemania nasuta Bosmans, 1988 — Cameroon

== Dendronetria ==
Dendronetria Millidge & Russell-Smith, 1992

- Dendronetria humilis Millidge & Russell-Smith, 1992 — Borneo
- Dendronetria obscura Millidge & Russell-Smith, 1992 (type species) — Borneo

== Denisiphantes ==
Denisiphantes Tu, Li & Rollard, 2005

- Denisiphantes denisi (Schenkel, 1963) — China

== Diastanillus ==
Diastanillus Simon, 1926

- Diastanillus pecuarius (Simon, 1884) — France, Austria

== Dicornua ==
Dicornua Oi, 1960

- Dicornua hikosanensis Oi, 1960 — Japan

== Dicymbium ==
Dicymbium Menge, 1868

- Dicymbium elongatum (Emerton, 1882) — USA, Canada
- Dicymbium facetum (L. Koch, 1879) — Russia, Mongolia
- Dicymbium libidinosum (Kulczynski, 1926) — Russia, China
- Dicymbium nigrum (Blackwall, 1834) — Palearctic
  - Dicymbium nigrum brevisetosum Locket, 1962 (type species) — Europe
- Dicymbium salaputium Saito, 1986 — Japan
- Dicymbium sinofacetum Tanasevitch, 2006 — China
- Dicymbium tibiale (Blackwall, 1836) — Palearctic
- Dicymbium yaginumai Eskov & Marusik, 1994 — Russia, Japan

== Didectoprocnemis ==
Didectoprocnemis Denis, 1949

- Didectoprocnemis cirtensis (Simon, 1884) — Portugal, France, Algeria, Morocco, Tunisia

== Diechomma ==
Diechomma Millidge, 1991

- Diechomma exiguum (Millidge, 1991) — Colombia
- Diechomma pretiosum Millidge, 1991 (type species) — Colombia

== Diplocentria ==
Diplocentria Hull, 1911

- Diplocentria bidentata (Emerton, 1882) (type species) — Holarctic
- Diplocentria changajensis Wunderlich, 1995 — Mongolia
- Diplocentria forsslundi Holm, 1939 — Sweden
- Diplocentria hiberna (Barrows, 1945) — USA
- Diplocentria mediocris (Simon, 1884) — Europe
- Diplocentria perplexa (Chamberlin & Ivie, 1939) — USA, Canada
- Diplocentria rectangulata (Emerton, 1915) — Holarctic
- Diplocentria retinax (Crosby & Bishop, 1936) — USA, Canada

== Diplocephaloides ==
Diplocephaloides Oi, 1960

- Diplocephaloides falcatus Seo, 2018 — Korea
- Diplocephaloides saganus (Bösenberg & Strand, 1906) (type species) — Korea, Japan
- Diplocephaloides uncatus Song & Li, 2010 — China

== Diplocephalus ==
Diplocephalus Bertkau, 1883

- Diplocephalus algericus Bosmans, 1996 — Algeria
- Diplocephalus alpinus (O. P.-Cambridge, 1872) — Italy, Central Europe to Russia
- Diplocephalus altimontanus Deltshev, 1984 — Bulgaria
- Diplocephalus arnoi Isaia, 2005 — Italy
- Diplocephalus barbiger (Roewer, 1955) — Holarctic
- Diplocephalus bicurvatus Bösenberg & Strand, 1906 — Japan
- Diplocephalus bifurcatus Tanasevitch, 1989 — Turkmenistan
- Diplocephalus caecus Denis, 1952 — Belgium
- Diplocephalus caucasicus Tanasevitch, 1987 — Turkey, Russia, Georgia
- Diplocephalus connatus Bertkau, 1889 — Palearctic
  - Diplocephalus connatus jacksoni O. P.-Cambridge, 1903 — England
- Diplocephalus crassilobus (Simon, 1884) — Europe, Turkey
- Diplocephalus cristatus (Blackwall, 1833) — Holarctic, New Zealand, Falkland Islands
- Diplocephalus culminicola Simon, 1884 — France
- Diplocephalus dentatus Tullgren, 1955 — Northern, Central Europe to Ukraine
- Diplocephalus graecus (O. P.-Cambridge, 1872) — Europe, North Africa, Israel
- Diplocephalus gravidus Strand, 1906 — Japan
- Diplocephalus guidoi Frick & Isaia, 2012 — Italy
- Diplocephalus helleri (L. Koch, 1869) — Europe
- Diplocephalus hispidulus Saito & Ono, 2001 — Japan
- Diplocephalus hungaricus Kulczynski, 1915 — Hungary
- Diplocephalus inanis Tanasevitch, 2014 - Morocco
- Diplocephalus lancearius (Simon, 1884) — Algeria
- Diplocephalus latifrons (O. P.-Cambridge, 1863) — Europe, Russia
- Diplocephalus longicarpus (Simon, 1884) — France
- Diplocephalus lusiscus (Simon, 1872) — France, Belgium, Germany, Switzerland
- Diplocephalus machadoi Bosmans & Cardoso, 2010 — Portugal
- Diplocephalus marijae Bosmans, 2010 — Portugal
- Diplocephalus marusiki Eskov, 1988 — Russia
- Diplocephalus mirabilis Eskov, 1988 — Russia, China
- Diplocephalus montaneus Tanasevitch, 1992 — Central Asia
- Diplocephalus montanus Eskov, 1988 — Russia
- Diplocephalus mystacinus (Simon, 1884) — Algeria, Tunisia
- Diplocephalus parentalis Song & Li, 2010 — China
- Diplocephalus pavesii Pesarini, 1996 — Switzerland, Italy
- Diplocephalus permixtus (O. P.-Cambridge, 1871) — Palearctic
- Diplocephalus picinus (Blackwall, 1841) — Palearctic
- Diplocephalus procer (Simon, 1884) — Southern Europe
- Diplocephalus protuberans (O. P.-Cambridge, 1875) — Europe
- Diplocephalus pseudocrassilobus Gnelitsa, 2006 — Ukraine
- Diplocephalus pullinus Simon, 1918 — France
- Diplocephalus rostratus Schenkel, 1934 — Austria
- Diplocephalus sphagnicola Eskov, 1988 — Russia, Canada
- Diplocephalus subrostratus (O. P.-Cambridge, 1873) — Holarctic
- Diplocephalus tiberinus (Caporiacco, 1936) — Italy
- Diplocephalus toscanaensis Wunderlich, 2011 — Italy
- Diplocephalus transcaucasicus Tanasevitch, 1990 — Azerbaijan, Iran
- Diplocephalus turcicus Brignoli, 1972 — Greece, Turkey
- Diplocephalus uliginosus Eskov, 1988 — Russia

== Diploplecta ==
Diploplecta Millidge, 1988

- Diploplecta adjacens Millidge, 1988 — New Zealand
- Diploplecta communis Millidge, 1988 (type species) — New Zealand
- Diploplecta duplex Millidge, 1988 — New Zealand
- Diploplecta nuda Millidge, 1988 — New Zealand
- Diploplecta opaca Millidge, 1988 — New Zealand
- Diploplecta proxima Millidge, 1988 — New Zealand
- Diploplecta simplex Millidge, 1988 — New Zealand

== Diplostyla ==
Diplostyla Emerton, 1882

- Diplostyla concolor (Wider, 1834) — Holarctic

== Diplothyron ==
Diplothyron Millidge, 1991

- Diplothyron fuscus Millidge, 1991 — Venezuela

== Disembolus ==
Disembolus Chamberlin & Ivie, 1933

- Disembolus alpha (Chamberlin, 1949) — USA
- Disembolus amoenus Millidge, 1981 — USA
- Disembolus anguineus Millidge, 1981 — USA
- Disembolus bairdi Edwards, 1999 — USA
- Disembolus beta Millidge, 1981 — USA
- Disembolus concinnus Millidge, 1981 — USA
- Disembolus convolutus Millidge, 1981 — USA
- Disembolus corneliae (Chamberlin & Ivie, 1944) — USA
- Disembolus galeatus Millidge, 1981 — USA
- Disembolus hyalinus Millidge, 1981 — Canada
- Disembolus implexus Millidge, 1981 — USA
- Disembolus implicatus Millidge, 1981 — USA
- Disembolus kesimbus (Chamberlin, 1949) — USA
- Disembolus lacteus Millidge, 1981 — USA
- Disembolus lacunatus Millidge, 1981 — USA
- Disembolus phanus (Chamberlin, 1949) — USA
- Disembolus procerus Millidge, 1981 — USA
- Disembolus sacerdotalis (Crosby & Bishop, 1933) — USA, Canada
- Disembolus sinuosus Millidge, 1981 — USA
- Disembolus solanus Millidge, 1981 — USA
- Disembolus stridulans Chamberlin & Ivie, 1933 (type species) — USA
- Disembolus torquatus Millidge, 1981 — USA
- Disembolus vicinus Millidge, 1981 — USA
- Disembolus zygethus Chamberlin, 1949 — USA

== Dismodicus ==
Dismodicus Simon, 1884

- Dismodicus alticeps Chamberlin & Ivie, 1947 — Russia, Alaska, Canada, USA
- Dismodicus bifrons (Blackwall, 1841) (type species) — Palearctic
- Dismodicus decemoculatus (Emerton, 1882) — USA, Canada, Greenland
- Dismodicus elevatus (C. L. Koch, 1838) — Palearctic
- Dismodicus fungiceps Denis, 1944 — France
- Dismodicus modicus Chamberlin & Ivie, 1947 — Alaska

== Doenitzius ==
Doenitzius Oi, 1960

- Doenitzius minutus Seo, 2018 — Korea
- Doenitzius peniculus Oi, 1960 (type species) — Korea, Japan
- Doenitzius pruvus Oi, 1960 — Russia, China, Korea, Japan

== Dolabritor ==
Dolabritor Millidge, 1991

- Dolabritor ascifer Millidge, 1991 — Colombia
- Dolabritor spineus Millidge, 1991 (type species) — Colombia

== Donacochara ==
Donacochara Simon, 1884

- Donacochara deminuta Locket, 1968 — Angola
- Donacochara speciosa (Thorell, 1875) (type species) — Europe to Central Asia

== Drapetisca ==
Drapetisca Menge, 1866

- Drapetisca alteranda Chamberlin, 1909 — USA
- Drapetisca australis Forster, 1955 — Antipodes Islands
- Drapetisca bicruris Tu & Li, 2006 — China
- Drapetisca oteroana Gertsch, 1951 — USA
- Drapetisca socialis (Sundevall, 1833) (type species) — Palearctic

== Drepanotylus ==
Drepanotylus Holm, 1945

- Drepanotylus aduncus Sha & Zhu, 1995 — China
- Drepanotylus borealis Holm, 1945 — Sweden, Finland, Russia, Kazakhstan
- Drepanotylus holmi (Eskov, 1981) — Russia, Mongolia
- Drepanotylus pirinicus Deltshev, 1992 — Bulgaria
- Drepanotylus uncatus (O. P.-Cambridge, 1873) (type species) — Palearctic

== Dresconella ==
Dresconella Denis, 1950

- Dresconella nivicola (Simon, 1884) — France

== Dubiaranea ==
Dubiaranea Mello-Leitao, 1943

- Dubiaranea abjecta Millidge, 1991 — Ecuador, Peru
- Dubiaranea abundans Millidge, 1991 — Peru
- Dubiaranea affinis Millidge, 1991 — Ecuador
- Dubiaranea albodorsata Millidge, 1991 — Colombia
- Dubiaranea albolineata Millidge, 1991 — Peru
- Dubiaranea amoena Millidge, 1991 — Peru
- Dubiaranea argentata Millidge, 1991 — Bolivia
- Dubiaranea argenteovittata Mello-Leitao, 1943 (type species) — Brazil
- Dubiaranea atra Millidge, 1991 — Bolivia
- Dubiaranea atriceps Millidge, 1991 — Peru
- Dubiaranea atripalpis Millidge, 1991 — Venezuela
- Dubiaranea atrolineata Millidge, 1991 — Colombia
- Dubiaranea aureola Millidge, 1991 — Peru
- Dubiaranea bacata Millidge, 1991 — Peru
- Dubiaranea brevis Millidge, 1991 — Bolivia
- Dubiaranea caeca Millidge, 1991 — Venezuela
- Dubiaranea caledonica (Millidge, 1985) — Chile
- Dubiaranea castanea Millidge, 1991 — Peru
- Dubiaranea cekalovici (Millidge, 1985) — Chile
- Dubiaranea cerea (Millidge, 1985) — Chile
- Dubiaranea colombiana Millidge, 1991 — Colombia
- Dubiaranea concors Millidge, 1991 — Colombia
- Dubiaranea congruens Millidge, 1991 — Ecuador
- Dubiaranea crebra Millidge, 1991 — Colombia, Venezuela, Ecuador, Peru
- Dubiaranea decora Millidge, 1991 — Peru
- Dubiaranea decurtata Millidge, 1991 — Bolivia
- Dubiaranea deelemanae Millidge, 1995 — Borneo
- Dubiaranea difficilis (Mello-Leitao, 1944) — Argentina
- Dubiaranea discolor Millidge, 1991 — Colombia
- Dubiaranea distincta (Nicolet, 1849) — Chile
- Dubiaranea distracta Millidge, 1991 — Colombia
- Dubiaranea elegans Millidge, 1991 — Peru
- Dubiaranea fagicola Millidge, 1991 — Chile
- Dubiaranea falcata (Millidge, 1985) — Chile
- Dubiaranea festiva (Millidge, 1985) — Chile
- Dubiaranea fruticola Millidge, 1991 — Peru
- Dubiaranea fulgens (Millidge, 1985) — Chile
- Dubiaranea fulvolineata Millidge, 1991 — Peru
- Dubiaranea furva Millidge, 1991 — Peru
- Dubiaranea fusca Millidge, 1991 — Peru
- Dubiaranea gilva Millidge, 1991 — Colombia
- Dubiaranea gloriosa Millidge, 1991 — Colombia
- Dubiaranea grandicula Millidge, 1991 — Peru
- Dubiaranea gregalis Millidge, 1991 — Peru
- Dubiaranea habilis Millidge, 1991 — Ecuador
- Dubiaranea inquilina (Millidge, 1985) — Brazil
- Dubiaranea insignita Millidge, 1991 — Peru, Bolivia
- Dubiaranea insulana Millidge, 1991 — Juan Fernández Islands
- Dubiaranea insulsa Millidge, 1991 — Ecuador
- Dubiaranea lepida Millidge, 1991 — Peru
- Dubiaranea levii Millidge, 1991 — Brazil
- Dubiaranea longa Millidge, 1991 — Peru
- Dubiaranea longiscapa (Millidge, 1985) — Chile
- Dubiaranea luctuosa Millidge, 1991 — Peru
- Dubiaranea lugubris Millidge, 1991 — Ecuador
- Dubiaranea maculata (Millidge, 1985) — Chile
- Dubiaranea manufera (Millidge, 1985) — Chile
- Dubiaranea margaritata Millidge, 1991 — Colombia, Venezuela
- Dubiaranea media Millidge, 1991 — Venezuela
- Dubiaranea mediocris Millidge, 1991 — Peru
- Dubiaranea melanocephala Millidge, 1991 — Peru
- Dubiaranea melica Millidge, 1991 — Peru
- Dubiaranea mirabilis Millidge, 1991 — Ecuador
- Dubiaranea modica Millidge, 1991 — Ecuador
- Dubiaranea morata Millidge, 1991 — Ecuador
- Dubiaranea nivea Millidge, 1991 — Bolivia
- Dubiaranea opaca Millidge, 1991 — Peru
- Dubiaranea orba Millidge, 1991 — Ecuador
- Dubiaranea ornata Millidge, 1991 — Colombia
- Dubiaranea penai (Millidge, 1985) — Chile
- Dubiaranea persimilis Millidge, 1991 — Ecuador
- Dubiaranea procera Millidge, 1991 — Peru
- Dubiaranea propinquua (Millidge, 1985) — Chile
- Dubiaranea propria Millidge, 1991 — Colombia
- Dubiaranea proxima Millidge, 1991 — Ecuador
- Dubiaranea pulchra Millidge, 1991 — Venezuela
- Dubiaranea pullata Millidge, 1991 — Peru
- Dubiaranea remota Millidge, 1991 — Argentina
- Dubiaranea rufula Millidge, 1991 — Peru
- Dubiaranea saucia Millidge, 1991 — Brazil
- Dubiaranea setigera Millidge, 1991 — Colombia
- Dubiaranea signifera Millidge, 1991 — Bolivia
- Dubiaranea silvae Millidge, 1991 — Peru
- Dubiaranea silvicola Millidge, 1991 — Colombia
- Dubiaranea similis Millidge, 1991 — Chile
- Dubiaranea solita Millidge, 1991 — Colombia
- Dubiaranea speciosa Millidge, 1991 — Peru
- Dubiaranea stellata (Millidge, 1985) — Chile
- Dubiaranea subtilis (Keyserling, 1886) — Peru
- Dubiaranea teres Millidge, 1991 — Ecuador
- Dubiaranea tridentata Millidge, 1993 — Peru
- Dubiaranea tristis (Mello-Leitao, 1941) — Argentina
- Dubiaranea truncata Millidge, 1991 — Peru
- Dubiaranea turbidula (Keyserling, 1886) — Brazil, Peru
- Dubiaranea usitata Millidge, 1991 — Colombia
- Dubiaranea varia Millidge, 1991 — Peru
- Dubiaranea variegata Millidge, 1991 — Colombia
- Dubiaranea versicolor Millidge, 1991 — Colombia, Ecuador, Peru
- Dubiaranea veterana Millidge, 1991 — Ecuador
- Dubiaranea vetusta Millidge, 1991 — Ecuador

== Dumoga ==
Dumoga Millidge & Russell-Smith, 1992

- Dumoga arboricola Millidge & Russell-Smith, 1992 (type species) — Sulawesi
- Dumoga buratino Tanasevitch, 2017 - Indonesia (Sumatra)
- Dumoga complexipalpis Millidge & Russell-Smith, 1992 — Sulawesi

== Dunedinia ==
Dunedinia Millidge, 1988

- Dunedinia decolor Millidge, 1988 — New Zealand
- Dunedinia denticulata Millidge, 1988 (type species) — New Zealand
- Dunedinia occidentalis Millidge, 1993 — Western Australia
- Dunedinia opaca Millidge, 1993 — South Australia
- Dunedinia pullata Millidge, 1988 — New Zealand

== Eborilaira ==
Eborilaira Eskov, 1989

- Eborilaira alpina Eskov, 1989 — Russia

== Eldonnia ==
Eldonnia Tanasevitch, 2008

- Eldonnia kayaensis (Paik, 1965) — Russia, Korea, Japan

== Emenista ==
Emenista Simon, 1894

- Emenista bisinuosa Simon, 1894 — India

== Enguterothrix ==
Enguterothrix Denis, 1962

- Enguterothrix crinipes Denis, 1962 (type species) — Congo
- Enguterothrix simpulum (Tanasevitch, 2014) - Thailand

== Entelecara ==
Entelecara Simon, 1884

- Entelecara acuminata (Wider, 1834) (type species) — Holarctic
- Entelecara aestiva Simon, 1918 — France, Italy
- Entelecara aurea Gao & Zhu, 1993 — China
- Entelecara cacuminum Denis, 1954 — France
- Entelecara congenera (O. P.-Cambridge, 1879) — Palearctic
- Entelecara dabudongensis Paik, 1983 — Russia, China, Korea, Japan
- Entelecara errata O. P.-Cambridge, 1913 — Europe, Russia
- Entelecara erythropus (Westring, 1851) — Palearctic
- Entelecara flavipes (Blackwall, 1834) — Europe, Russia
- Entelecara forsslundi Tullgren, 1955 — Sweden, Russia, Estonia, Ukraine
- Entelecara helfridae Tullgren, 1955 — Sweden
- Entelecara italica Thaler, 1984 — Italy
- Entelecara klefbecki Tullgren, 1955 — Sweden
- Entelecara media Kulczynski, 1887 — Holarctic
- Entelecara obscura Miller, 1971 — Czech Republic, Slovakia
- Entelecara omissa O. P.-Cambridge, 1902 — Europe
- Entelecara schmitzi Kulczynski, 1905 — Madeira, France
- Entelecara sombra (Chamberlin & Ivie, 1947) — Alaska, Canada, USA
- Entelecara tanikawai Tazoe, 1993 — Japan
- Entelecara truncatifrons (O. P.-Cambridge, 1875) — France, Corsica, Algeria
- Entelecara turbinata Simon, 1918 — France

== Eordea ==
Eordea Simon, 1899

- Eordea bicolor Simon, 1899 — Sumatra

== Epibellowia ==
Epibellowia Tanasevitch, 1996

- Epibellowia enormita (Tanasevitch, 1988) — Russia
- Epibellowia pacifica (Eskov & Marusik, 1992) — Russia
- Epibellowia septentrionalis (Oi, 1960) (type species) — Russia, Japan

== Epiceraticelus ==
Epiceraticelus Crosby & Bishop, 1931

- Epiceraticelus fluvialis Crosby & Bishop, 1931 — USA
- Epiceraticelus mandyae Draney, Milne, Ulyshen & Madriz, 2019 — USA

== Epigyphantes ==
Epigyphantes Saaristo & Tanasevitch, 2004

- Epigyphantes epigynatus (Tanasevitch, 1988) — Russia

== Epigytholus ==
Epigytholus Tanasevitch, 1996

- Epigytholus kaszabi (Wunderlich, 1995) — Russia, Mongolia

== Episolder ==
Episolder Tanasevitch, 1996

- Episolder finitimus Tanasevitch, 1996 — Russia

== Epiwubana ==
Epiwubana Millidge, 1991

- Epiwubana jucunda Millidge, 1991 — Chile

== Eridantes ==
Eridantes Crosby & Bishop, 1933

- Eridantes diodontos Prentice & Redak, 2013 — USA, Mexico
- Eridantes erigonoides (Emerton, 1882) (type species) — USA
- Eridantes utibilis Crosby & Bishop, 1933 — USA, Canada

== Erigomicronus ==
Erigomicronus Tanasevitch, 2018

- Erigomicronus lautus (Saito, 1984) — Japan
- Erigomicronus longembolus (Wunderlich & Li, 1995) (type species) — Russia (Far East), China

== Erigone ==
Erigone Audouin, 1826

- Erigone albescens Banks, 1898 — USA
- Erigone aletris Crosby & Bishop, 1928 — USA, Canada, Scotland, Italy
- Erigone allani Chamberlin & Ivie, 1947 — Alaska
- Erigone alsaida Crosby & Bishop, 1928 — USA
- Erigone angela Chamberlin & Ivie, 1939 — USA
- Erigone antarctica Simon, 1884 — Chile
- Erigone antegona Chickering, 1970 — Panama
- Erigone apophysalis Tanasevitch, 2017 — Sumatra
- Erigone aptuna Chickering, 1970 — Panama
- Erigone arctica (White, 1852) — Holarctic
  - Erigone arctica maritima Kulczynski, 1902 — Northern Europe, Russia
  - Erigone arctica palaearctica Braendegaard, 1934 — Scandinavia, Russia
  - Erigone arctica sibirica Kulczynski, 1908 — Russia
  - Erigone arctica soerenseni Holm, 1956 — Greenland
- Erigone arcticola Chamberlin & Ivie, 1947 — Russia, Kazakhstan, Alaska
- Erigone arctophylacis Crosby & Bishop, 1928 — USA, Canada
- Erigone aspura Chamberlin & Ivie, 1939 — Alaska
- Erigone atra Blackwall, 1833 — Holarctic
- Erigone autumnalis Emerton, 1882 — USA to Panama, West Indies, Azores, Europe, UAE
- Erigone barrowsi Crosby & Bishop, 1928 — USA
- Erigone benes Chamberlin & Ivie, 1939 — USA
- Erigone bereta Chickering, 1970 — Panama
- Erigone bifurca Locket, 1982 — Malaysia, Philippines, Krakatau
- Erigone blaesa Crosby & Bishop, 1928 — USA, Canada
- Erigone brevipes Tu & Li, 2004 — Vietnam
- Erigone canthognatha Chamberlin & Ivie, 1935 — USA
- Erigone clavipalpis Millidge, 1991 — Peru
- Erigone coloradensis Keyserling, 1886 — USA, Canada, Alaska
- Erigone convalescens Jocque, 1985 — Comoro Islands
- Erigone cristatopalpus Simon, 1884 — Holarctic
- Erigone crosbyi Schenkel, 1950 — USA
- Erigone dentichelis Miller, 1970 — Angola
- Erigone denticulata Chamberlin & Ivie, 1939 — USA
- Erigone dentigera O. P.-Cambridge, 1874 — Holarctic
- Erigone dentipalpis (Wider, 1834) — Holarctic
  - Erigone dentipalpis syriaca O. P.-Cambridge, 1872 — Syria
- Erigone dentosa O. P.-Cambridge, 1894 — USA to Guatemala, Antigua (Belgium, introduced)
- Erigone digena Chickering, 1970 — Panama, Jamaica, Puerto Rico
- Erigone dipona Chickering, 1970 — Panama
- Erigone dumitrescuae Georgescu, 1969 — Romania
- Erigone edentata Saito & Ono, 2001 — Japan
- Erigone eisenschmidti Wunderlich, 1976 — Queensland
- Erigone ephala Crosby & Bishop, 1928 — USA, Canada
- Erigone fellita Keyserling, 1886 — Peru
- Erigone fluctuans O. P.-Cambridge, 1875 — France
- Erigone fluminea Millidge, 1991 — Venezuela
- Erigone grandidens Tu & Li, 2004 — Vietnam
- Erigone himeshimensis Strand, 1918 — Japan
- Erigone hydrophytae Ivie & Barrows, 1935 — USA
- Erigone hypenema Crosby & Bishop, 1928 — USA
- Erigone hypoarctica Eskov, 1989 — Russia
- Erigone infernalis Keyserling, 1886 — USA
- Erigone irrita Jocque, 1984 — South Africa
- Erigone jaegeri Baehr, 1984 — Central Europe, China
- Erigone jugorum Simon, 1884 — France
- Erigone koratensis Strand, 1918 — Japan
- Erigone koshiensis Oi, 1960 — China, Korea, Taiwan, Japan
- Erigone lata Song & Li, 2008 — China
- Erigone longipalpis (Sundevall, 1830) (type species) — Palearctic
  - Erigone longipalpis meridionalis Simon, 1926 — England, France
  - Erigone longipalpis pirini Deltshev, 1983 — Bulgaria
- Erigone malvari Barrion & Litsinger, 1995 — Philippines
- Erigone matanuskae Chamberlin & Ivie, 1947 — Alaska
- Erigone miniata Baert, 1990 — Galapagos Islands
- Erigone monterreyensis Gertsch & Davis, 1937 — Mexico
- Erigone neocaledonica Kritscher, 1966 — New Caledonia
- Erigone nepalensis Wunderlich, 1983 — Nepal
- Erigone nigrimana Thorell, 1875 — Italy
- Erigone nitidithorax Miller, 1970 — Angola
- Erigone ostiaria Crosby & Bishop, 1928 — USA
- Erigone palustris Millidge, 1991 — Peru
- Erigone paradisicola Crosby & Bishop, 1928 — USA
- Erigone pauperula (Bösenberg & Strand, 1906) — Japan
- Erigone personata Gertsch & Davis, 1936 — USA
- Erigone poeyi Simon, 1897 — St. Vincent
- Erigone praecursa Chamberlin & Ivie, 1939 — USA
- Erigone prominens Bösenberg & Strand, 1906 — Cameroon to Japan, New Zealand
- Erigone promiscua (O. P.-Cambridge, 1873) — Europe, Russia
- Erigone pseudovagans Caporiacco, 1935 — Karakorum
- Erigone psychrophila Thorell, 1871 — Holarctic
- Erigone reducta Schenkel, 1950 — USA
- Erigone remota L. Koch, 1869 — Palearctic
  - Erigone remota dentigera Simon, 1926 — Switzerland
- Erigone rohtangensis Tikader, 1981 — India
- Erigone rutila Millidge, 1995 — Thailand
- Erigone sagibia Strand, 1918 — Japan
- Erigone sagicola Dönitz & Strand, 1906 — Japan
- Erigone sinensis Schenkel, 1936 — Russia, Kyrgyzstan, Mongolia, China
- Erigone sirimonensis Bosmans, 1977 — Kenya
- Erigone spadix Thorell, 1875 — Italy
- Erigone stygia Gertsch, 1973 — Hawaii
- Erigone svenssoni Holm, 1975 — Scandinavia, Russia
- Erigone tamazunchalensis Gertsch & Davis, 1937 — Mexico
- Erigone tanana Chamberlin & Ivie, 1947 — Alaska
- Erigone tenuimana Simon, 1884 — Europe
- Erigone tepena Chickering, 1970 — Jamaica
- Erigone tirolensis L. Koch, 1872 — Holarctic
- Erigone tolucana Gertsch & Davis, 1937 — Mexico
- Erigone tristis (Banks, 1892) — USA
- Erigone uintana Chamberlin & Ivie, 1935 — USA
- Erigone uliginosa Millidge, 1991 — Peru
- Erigone watertoni Simon, 1897 — St. Vincent
- Erigone welchi Jackson, 1911 — Ireland to Estonia, Moldavia
- Erigone whitneyana Chamberlin & Ivie, 1935 — USA
- Erigone whymperi O. P.-Cambridge, 1877 — Canada, Greenland, Russia, Mongilia
  - Erigone whymperi minor Jackson, 1933 — Canada
- Erigone wiltoni Locket, 1973 — New Zealand, Comoro Islands
- Erigone zabluta Keyserling, 1886 — Peru
- Erigone zheduoshanensis Song & Li, 2008 — China

== Erigonella ==
Erigonella Dahl, 1901

- Erigonella groenlandica Strand, 1905 — Canada
- Erigonella hiemalis (Blackwall, 1841) (type species) — Palearctic
- Erigonella ignobilis (O. P.-Cambridge, 1871) — Palearctic
- Erigonella stubbei Heimer, 1987 — Mongolia
- Erigonella subelevata (L. Koch, 1869) — Europe
  - Erigonella subelevata pyrenaea Denis, 1964 — France

== Erigonoploides ==
Erigonoploides Eskov, 1989

- Erigonoploides cardiratus Eskov, 1989 — Russia

== Erigonoplus ==
Erigonoplus Simon, 1884

- Erigonoplus castellanus (O. P.-Cambridge, 1875) — Portugal, Spain
- Erigonoplus depressifrons (Simon, 1884) — Portugal, Spain, France
- Erigonoplus dilatus (Denis, 1949) — Andorra
- Erigonoplus foveatus (Dahl, 1912) - Central Europe to Ukraine, Russia
- Erigonoplus globipes (L. Koch, 1872) — Palearctic
- Erigonoplus inclarus (Simon, 1881) (type species) — Corsica
- Erigonoplus inspinosus Wunderlich, 1995 — Greece
- Erigonoplus jarmilae (Miller, 1943) — Austria, Czech Republic, Slovakia, Russia
- Erigonoplus justus (O. P.-Cambridge, 1875) — Belgium, France, Germany
- Erigonoplus kirghizicus Tanasevitch, 1989 — Kazakhstan
- Erigonoplus latefissus (Denis, 1968) — Morocco
- Erigonoplus minaretifer Eskov, 1986 — Russia
- Erigonoplus nasutus (O. P.-Cambridge, 1879) — Portugal, France
- Erigonoplus nigrocaeruleus (Simon, 1881) — Corsica, Iran
- Erigonoplus ninae Tanasevitch & Fet, 1986 — Turkmenistan, Iran
- Erigonoplus nobilis Thaler, 1991 — Italy
- Erigonoplus sengleti Tanasevitch, 2008 — Iran
- Erigonoplus setosus Wunderlich, 1995 — Croatia, Greece
- Erigonoplus sibiricus Eskov & Marusik, 1997 — Russia
- Erigonoplus simplex Millidge, 1979 — Italy
- Erigonoplus spinifemuralis Dimitrov, 2003 — Greece, Bulgaria, Turkey, Ukraine
- Erigonoplus turriger (Simon, 1881) — France
- Erigonoplus zagros Tanasevitch, 2009 — Iran

== Erigonops ==
Erigonops Scharff, 1990

- Erigonops littoralis (Hewitt, 1915) — South Africa

== Erigophantes ==
Erigophantes Wunderlich, 1995

- Erigophantes borneoensis Wunderlich, 1995 — Borneo

== Eskovia ==
Eskovia Marusik & Saaristo, 1999

- Eskovia exarmata (Eskov, 1989) (type species) — Russia, Canada
- Eskovia mongolica Marusik & Saaristo, 1999 — Mongolia

== Eskovina ==
Eskovina Kocak & Kemal, 2006

- Eskovina clava (Zhu & Wen, 1980) — Russia, China, Korea

== Esophyllas ==
Esophyllas Prentice & Redak, 2012

- Esophyllas synankylis Prentice & Redak, 2012 — USA
- Esophyllas vetteri Prentice & Redak, 2012 (type species) — USA

== Estrandia ==
Estrandia Blauvelt, 1936

- Estrandia grandaeva (Keyserling, 1886) — Holarctic

== Eulaira ==
Eulaira Chamberlin & Ivie, 1933

- Eulaira altura Chamberlin & Ivie, 1945 — USA
- Eulaira arctoa Holm, 1960 — Alaska
- Eulaira chelata Chamberlin & Ivie, 1939 — USA
- Eulaira dela Chamberlin & Ivie, 1933 (type species) — USA
- Eulaira delana Chamberlin & Ivie, 1939 — USA
- Eulaira hidalgoana Gertsch & Davis, 1937 — Mexico
- Eulaira kaiba Chamberlin, 1949 — USA
- Eulaira mana Chamberlin & Ivie, 1935 — USA
- Eulaira obscura Chamberlin & Ivie, 1945 — USA
- Eulaira schediana Chamberlin & Ivie, 1933 — USA
  - Eulaira schediana nigrescens Chamberlin & Ivie, 1945 — USA
- Eulaira simplex (Chamberlin, 1919) — USA
- Eulaira suspecta Gertsch & Mulaik, 1936 — USA
- Eulaira thumbia Chamberlin & Ivie, 1945 — USA
- Eulaira wioma Chamberlin, 1949 — USA

== Eurymorion ==
Eurymorion Millidge, 1993

- Eurymorion insigne (Millidge, 1991) (type species) — Brazil
- Eurymorion mourai Rodrigues & Ott, 2010 — Brazil
- Eurymorion murici Rodrigues & Ott, 2010 — Brazil
- Eurymorion nobile (Millidge, 1991) — Brazil
- Eurymorion triunfo Rodrigues & Ott, 2010 — Bolivia, Brazil

== Evansia ==
Evansia O. P.-Cambridge, 1900

- Evansia merens O. P.-Cambridge, 1901 — Palearctic

== Exechopsis ==
Exechopsis Millidge, 1991

- Exechopsis conspicua Millidge, 1991 — Peru, Brazil
- Exechopsis eberhardi Rodrigues, Lemos & Brescovit, 2013 — Brazil
- Exechopsis versicolor Millidge, 1991 (type species) — Colombia, Ecuador

== Exocora ==
Exocora Millidge, 1991

- Exocora girotii Lemos & Brescovit, 2013 — Brazil
- Exocora medonho Lemos & Brescovit, 2013 — Brazil
- Exocora nogueirai Lemos & Brescovit, 2013 — Brazil
- Exocora pallida Millidge, 1991 — Venezuela
- Exocora phoenix Lemos & Brescovit, 2013 — Brazil
- Exocora proba Millidge, 1991 (type species) — Bolivia
- Exocora ribeiroi Lemos & Brescovit, 2013 — Brazil
- Exocora una Lemos & Brescovit, 2013 — Brazil

== Fageiella ==
Fageiella Kratochvil, 1934

- Fageiella ensigera Deeleman-Reinhold, 1974 — Serbia
- Fageiella patellata (Kulczynski, 1913) (type species) — Southeastern Europe

== Falklandoglenes ==
Falklandoglenes Usher, 1983

- Falklandoglenes spinosa Usher, 1983 — Falkland Islands

== Fissiscapus ==
Fissiscapus Millidge, 1991

- Fissiscapus attercop Miller, 2007 — Ecuador
- Fissiscapus fractus Millidge, 1991 — Colombia
- Fissiscapus pusillus Millidge, 1991 (type species) — Colombia

== Fistulaphantes ==
Fistulaphantes Tanasevitch & Saaristo, 2006

- Fistulaphantes canalis Tanasevitch & Saaristo, 2006 — Nepal

== Flagelliphantes ==
Flagelliphantes Saaristo & Tanasevitch, 1996

- Flagelliphantes bergstromi (Schenkel, 1931) — Palearctic
- Flagelliphantes flagellifer (Tanasevitch, 1988) (type species) — Russia
- Flagelliphantes sterneri (Eskov & Marusik, 1994) — Russia

== Floricomus ==
Floricomus Crosby & Bishop, 1925

- Floricomus bishopi Ivie & Barrows, 1935 — USA
- Floricomus crosbyi Ivie & Barrows, 1935 — USA
- Floricomus littoralis Chamberlin & Ivie, 1935 — USA
- Floricomus mulaiki Gertsch & Davis, 1936 — USA
- Floricomus nasutus (Emerton, 1911) — USA
- Floricomus nigriceps (Banks, 1906) — USA
- Floricomus ornatulus Gertsch & Ivie, 1936 — USA
- Floricomus plumalis (Crosby, 1905) — USA
- Floricomus praedesignatus Bishop & Crosby, 1935 — USA, Canada
- Floricomus pythonicus Crosby & Bishop, 1925 — USA
- Floricomus rostratus (Emerton, 1882) (type species) — USA
- Floricomus setosus Chamberlin & Ivie, 1944 — USA
- Floricomus tallulae Chamberlin & Ivie, 1944 — USA

== Florinda ==
Florinda O. P.-Cambridge, 1896

- Florinda coccinea (Hentz, 1850) — USA, Mexico, West Indies

== Floronia ==
Floronia Simon, 1887

- Floronia annulipes Berland, 1913 — Ecuador
- Floronia bucculenta (Clerck, 1757) (type species) — Europe, Russia
- Floronia exornata (L. Koch, 1878) — Korea, Japan
- Floronia hunanensis Li & Song, 1993 — China
- Floronia jiuhuensis Li & Zhu, 1987 — China
- Floronia zhejiangensis Zhu, Chen & Sha, 1987 — China

== Formiphantes ==
Formiphantes Saaristo & Tanasevitch, 1996

- Formiphantes lephthyphantiformis (Strand, 1907) — Europe

== Frederickus ==
Frederickus Paquin et al., 2008

- Frederickus coylei Paquin et al., 2008 (type species) — USA, Canada
- Frederickus wilburi (Levi & Levi, 1955) — USA, Canada

== Frontella ==
Frontella Kulczynski, 1908

- Frontella pallida Kulczynski, 1908 — Russia

== Frontinella ==
Frontinella F. O. P.-Cambridge, 1902

- Frontinella bella Bryant, 1948 — Hispaniola
- Frontinella communis (Hentz, 1850) — North, Central America
- Frontinella huachuca Gertsch & Davis, 1946 — USA
  - Frontinella huachuca benevola Gertsch & Davis, 1946 — Mexico
- Frontinella hubeiensis Li & Song, 1993 — China
- Frontinella laeta (O. P.-Cambridge, 1898) (type species) — Mexico
- Frontinella omega Kraus, 1955 — El Salvador
- Frontinella potosia Gertsch & Davis, 1946 — Mexico
- Frontinella pyramitela (Walckenaer, 1841) — North, Central America
- Frontinella tibialis F. O. P.-Cambridge, 1902 — Mexico
- Frontinella zhui Li & Song, 1993 — China

== Frontinellina ==
Frontinellina van Helsdingen, 1969

- Frontinellina dearmata (Kulczynski, 1899) — Madeira
- Frontinellina frutetorum (C. L. Koch, 1834) (type species) — Palearctic
- Frontinellina locketi van Helsdingen, 1970 — South Africa

== Frontiphantes ==
Frontiphantes Wunderlich, 1987

- Frontiphantes fulgurenotatus (Schenkel, 1938) — Madeira

== Fusciphantes ==
Fusciphantes Oi, 1960

- Fusciphantes enmusubi (Ihara, Nakano & Tomikawa, 2017) — Japan
- Fusciphantes hibanus (Saito, 1992) — Japan
- Fusciphantes iharai (Saito, 1992) — Japan
- Fusciphantes longiscapus Oi, 1960 (type species) — Japan
- Fusciphantes nojimai (Ihara, 1995) — Japan
- Fusciphantes occidentalis (Ihara, Nakano & Tomikawa, 2017) — Japan
- Fusciphantes okiensis (Ihara, 1995) — Japan
- Fusciphantes saitoi (Ihara, 1995) — Japan
- Fusciphantes setouchi (Ihara, 1995) — Japan
- Fusciphantes tsurusakii (Ihara, 1995) — Japan

== Gibbafroneta ==
Gibbafroneta Merrett, 2004

- Gibbafroneta gibbosa Merrett, 2004 — Congo

== Gibothorax ==
Gibothorax Eskov, 1989

- Gibothorax tchernovi Eskov, 1989 — Russia

== Gigapassus ==
Gigapassus Miller, 2007

- Gigapassus octarine Miller, 2007 — Argentina

== Gladiata ==
Gladiata Zhao & Li, 2014

- Gladiata fengli Zhao & Li, 2014 - China

== Glebala ==
Glebala Zhao & Li, 2014

- Glebala aspera Zhao & Li, 2014 - China

== Glomerosus ==
Glomerosus Zhao & Li, 2014

- Glomerosus lateralis Zhao & Li, 2014 - China

== Glyphesis ==
Glyphesis Simon, 1926

- Glyphesis asiaticus Eskov, 1989 — Russia
- Glyphesis cottonae (La Touche, 1946) — Palearctic
- Glyphesis idahoanus (Chamberlin, 1949) — USA
- Glyphesis nemoralis Esyunin & Efimik, 1994 — Russia, Ukraine
- Glyphesis scopulifer (Emerton, 1882) — USA, Canada
- Glyphesis servulus (Simon, 1881) (type species) — Europe
- Glyphesis taoplesius Wunderlich, 1969 — Denmark, Germany, Hungary, Poland, Slovakia, Russia

== Gnathonargus ==
Gnathonargus Bishop & Crosby, 1935

- Gnathonargus unicorn (Banks, 1892) — USA

== Gnathonarium ==
Gnathonarium Karsch, 1881

- Gnathonarium biconcavum Tu & Li, 2004 — China
- Gnathonarium dentatum (Wider, 1834) (type species) — Palearctic
  - Gnathonarium dentatum orientale (O. P.-Cambridge, 1872) — Israel
- Gnathonarium exsiccatum (Bösenberg & Strand, 1906) — Japan
- Gnathonarium gibberum Oi, 1960 — Russia, China, Korea, Japan
- Gnathonarium luzon Tanasevitch, 2017 - Philippines
- Gnathonarium suppositum (Kulczynski, 1885) — Russia, Alaska, Canada
- Gnathonarium taczanowskii (O. P.-Cambridge, 1873) — Russia, Mongolia, China, Alaska, Canada

== Gnathonaroides ==
Gnathonaroides Bishop & Crosby, 1938

- Gnathonaroides pedalis (Emerton, 1923) — USA, Canada

== Gonatium ==
Gonatium Menge, 1868

- Gonatium arimaense Oi, 1960 — Korea, Japan
- Gonatium biimpressum Simon, 1884 — Corsica to Italy
- Gonatium cappadocium Millidge, 1981 — Turkey
- Gonatium crassipalpum Bryant, 1933 — USA, Canada, Alaska
- Gonatium dayense Simon, 1884 — Algeria
- Gonatium ensipotens (Simon, 1881) — Southwestern Europe
- Gonatium geniculosum Simon, 1918 — France
- Gonatium hilare (Thorell, 1875) — Palearctic
- Gonatium japonicum Simon, 1906 — Russia, China, Korea, Japan
- Gonatium nemorivagum (O. P.-Cambridge, 1875) — Southern Europe
- Gonatium nipponicum Millidge, 1981 — Russia, Japan
- Gonatium occidentale Simon, 1918 — France, Spain, Algeria, Morocco. Israel
- Gonatium orientale Fage, 1931 — Romania, Bulgaria
- Gonatium pacificum Eskov, 1989 — Russia
- Gonatium paradoxum (L. Koch, 1869) — Palearctic
- Gonatium petrunkewitschi Caporiacco, 1949 — Kenya
- Gonatium rubellum (Blackwall, 1841) — Palearctic
- Gonatium rubens (Blackwall, 1833) (type species) — Palearctic
- Gonatium strugaense Drensky, 1929 — Macedonia

== Gonatoraphis ==
Gonatoraphis Millidge, 1991

- Gonatoraphis aenea Millidge, 1991 — Colombia
- Gonatoraphis lobata Millidge, 1991 (type species) — Colombia
- Gonatoraphis lysistrata Miller, 2007 — Colombia

== Goneatara ==
Goneatara Bishop & Crosby, 1935

- Goneatara eranistes (Crosby & Bishop, 1927) — USA
- Goneatara nasutus (Barrows, 1943) — USA
- Goneatara platyrhinus (Crosby & Bishop, 1927) (type species) — USA
- Goneatara plausibilis Bishop & Crosby, 1935 — USA

== Gongylidiellum ==
Gongylidiellum Simon, 1884

- Gongylidiellum blandum Miller, 1970 — Angola
- Gongylidiellum bracteatum Zhao & Li, 2014 - China
- Gongylidiellum caucasicum Tanasevitch & Ponomarev, 2015 - Russia
- Gongylidiellum confusum Thaler, 1987 — India, Pakistan
- Gongylidiellum crassipes Denis, 1952 — Romania
- Gongylidiellum edentatum Miller, 1951 — Central, southern Europe
- Gongylidiellum hipponense (Simon, 1926) — Algeria
- Gongylidiellum kathmanduense Wunderlich, 1983 — Nepal
- Gongylidiellum latebricola (O. P.-Cambridge, 1871) (type species) — Palearctic
- Gongylidiellum linguiformis Tu & Li, 2004 — Vietnam
- Gongylidiellum minutum (Banks, 1892) — USA
- Gongylidiellum murcidum Simon, 1884 — Palearctic
- Gongylidiellum nepalense Wunderlich, 1983 — India, Nepal
- Gongylidiellum nigrolimbatum Caporiacco, 1935 — Karakorum
- Gongylidiellum orduense Wunderlich, 1995 — Turkey, Georgia
- Gongylidiellum tennesseense Petrunkevitch, 1925 — USA
- Gongylidiellum uschuaiense Simon, 1902 — Argentina
- Gongylidiellum vivum (O. P.-Cambridge, 1875) — Palearctic

== Gongylidioides ==
Gongylidioides Oi, 1960

- Gongylidioides acmodontus Tu & Li, 2006 — China
- Gongylidioides angustus Tu & Li, 2006 — Taiwan
- Gongylidioides communis Saito & Ono, 2001 — Japan
- Gongylidioides cucullatus Oi, 1960 (type species) — Japan
- Gongylidioides diellipticus Song & Li, 2008 — Taiwan
- Gongylidioides foratus (Ma & Zhu, 1990) — China
- Gongylidioides galeritus Saito & Ono, 2001 — Japan
- Gongylidioides griseolineatus (Schenkel, 1936) — Russia, China
- Gongylidioides kaihotsui Saito & Ono, 2001 — Japan
- Gongylidioides keralaensis Tanasevitch, 2011 — India
- Gongylidioides kouqianensis Tu & Li, 2006 — China
- Gongylidioides lagenoscapis Yin, 2012 — China
- Gongylidioides monocornis Saito & Ono, 2001 — Japan
- Gongylidioides onoi Tazoe, 1994 — China, Vietnam, Japan
- Gongylidioides pectinatus Tanasevitch, 2011 — India
- Gongylidioides protegulus Tanasevitch & Marusik, 2019 — Taiwan
- Gongylidioides rimatus (Ma & Zhu, 1990) — Russia, China
- Gongylidioides ussuricus Eskov, 1992 — Russia, China

== Gongylidium ==
Gongylidium Menge, 1868

- Gongylidium baltoroi Caporiacco, 1935 — Karakorum
- Gongylidium rufipes (Linnaeus, 1758) (type species) — Palearctic
- Gongylidium soror Thaler, 1993 — Italy

== Grammonota ==
Grammonota Emerton, 1882

- Grammonota angusta Dondale, 1959 — USA, Canada
- Grammonota barnesi Dondale, 1959 — USA
- Grammonota calcarata Bryant, 1948 — Hispaniola
- Grammonota capitata Emerton, 1924 — USA
- Grammonota chamberlini Ivie & Barrows, 1935 — USA
- Grammonota coloradensis Dondale, 1959 — USA
- Grammonota culebra Müller & Heimer, 1991 — Colombia
- Grammonota dalunda Chickering, 1970 — Panama
- Grammonota dubia (O. P.-Cambridge, 1898) — Guatemala
- Grammonota electa Bishop & Crosby, 1933 — Costa Rica
- Grammonota emertoni Bryant, 1940 — Cuba
- Grammonota gentilis Banks, 1898 — North America
- Grammonota gigas (Banks, 1896) — USA
- Grammonota innota Chickering, 1970 — Panama
- Grammonota inornata Emerton, 1882 — USA, Canada
- Grammonota insana (Banks, 1898) — Mexico
- Grammonota inusiata Bishop & Crosby, 1933 — USA
- Grammonota jamaicensis Dondale, 1959 — Jamaica
- Grammonota kincaidi (Banks, 1906) — USA
- Grammonota lutacola Chickering, 1970 — Panama
- Grammonota maculata Banks, 1896 — USA, Costa Rica
- Grammonota maritima Emerton, 1925 — Canada
- Grammonota nigriceps Banks, 1898 — Mexico
- Grammonota nigrifrons Gertsch & Mulaik, 1936 — USA
- Grammonota ornata (O. P.-Cambridge, 1875) — USA, Canada
- Grammonota pallipes Banks, 1895 — USA
- Grammonota pergrata (O. P.-Cambridge, 1894) — Guatemala
- Grammonota pictilis (O. P.-Cambridge, 1875) (type species) — USA, Canada
- Grammonota salicicola Chamberlin, 1949 — USA
- Grammonota samariensis Müller & Heimer, 1991 — Colombia
- Grammonota secata Chickering, 1970 — Panama, Colombia
- Grammonota semipallida Emerton, 1919 — Canada
- Grammonota subarctica Dondale, 1959 — Alaska
- Grammonota suspiciosa Gertsch & Mulaik, 1936 — USA
- Grammonota tabuna Chickering, 1970 — Costa Rica, Panama
- Grammonota teresta Chickering, 1970 — Mexico, Panama, Colombia
- Grammonota texana (Banks, 1899) — USA
- Grammonota trivittata Banks, 1895 — USA
  - Grammonota trivittata georgiana Chamberlin & Ivie, 1944 — USA
- Grammonota vittata Barrows, 1919 — USA
- Grammonota zephyra Dondale, 1959 — USA

== Graphomoa ==
Graphomoa Chamberlin, 1924

- Graphomoa theridioides Chamberlin, 1924 — USA

== Gravipalpus ==
Gravipalpus Millidge, 1991

- Gravipalpus callosus Millidge, 1991 (type species) — Brazil
- Gravipalpus crassus Millidge, 1991 — Peru
- Gravipalpus standifer Miller, 2007 — Argentina

== Habreuresis ==
Habreuresis Millidge, 1991

- Habreuresis falcata Millidge, 1991 (type species) — Chile
- Habreuresis recta Millidge, 1991 — Chile

== Halorates ==
Halorates Hull, 1911

- Halorates altaicus Tanasevitch, 2013 — Kazakhstan
- Halorates concavus Tanasevitch, 2011 — Pakistan
- Halorates reprobus (O. P.-Cambridge, 1879) (type species) — Europe, Russia
- Halorates sexastriatus Fei, Gao & Chen, 1997 — China

== Haplinis ==
Haplinis Simon, 1894

- Haplinis abbreviata (Blest, 1979) — New Zealand
- Haplinis alticola Blest & Vink, 2002 — New Zealand
- Haplinis anomala Blest & Vink, 2003 — New Zealand
- Haplinis antipodiana Blest & Vink, 2002 — New Zealand
- Haplinis attenuata Blest & Vink, 2002 — New Zealand
- Haplinis australis Blest & Vink, 2003 — Tasmania
- Haplinis banksi (Blest, 1979) — New Zealand
- Haplinis brevipes (Blest, 1979) — Chatham Islands
- Haplinis chiltoni (Hogg, 1911) — New Zealand
- Haplinis contorta (Blest, 1979) — New Zealand
- Haplinis diloris (Urquhart, 1886) — New Zealand
- Haplinis dunstani (Blest, 1979) — New Zealand
- Haplinis exigua Blest & Vink, 2002 — New Zealand
- Haplinis fluviatilis (Blest, 1979) — New Zealand
- Haplinis fucatinia (Urquhart, 1894) — New Zealand
- Haplinis fulvolineata Blest & Vink, 2002 — New Zealand
- Haplinis horningi (Blest, 1979) — New Zealand
- Haplinis inexacta (Blest, 1979) — New Zealand
- Haplinis innotabilis (Blest, 1979) — New Zealand
- Haplinis insignis (Blest, 1979) — New Zealand
- Haplinis major (Blest, 1979) — New Zealand
- Haplinis marplesi Blest & Vink, 2003 — New Zealand
- Haplinis minutissima (Blest, 1979) — New Zealand
- Haplinis morainicola Blest & Vink, 2002 — New Zealand
- Haplinis mundenia (Urquhart, 1894) — New Zealand
- Haplinis paradoxa (Blest, 1979) — New Zealand
- Haplinis redacta (Blest, 1979) — New Zealand
- Haplinis rufocephala (Urquhart, 1888) — New Zealand
- Haplinis rupicola (Blest, 1979) — New Zealand
- Haplinis silvicola (Blest, 1979) — New Zealand
- Haplinis similis (Blest, 1979) — New Zealand
- Haplinis subclathrata Simon, 1894 (type species) — New Zealand
- Haplinis subdola (O. P.-Cambridge, 1879) — New Zealand
- Haplinis subtilis Blest & Vink, 2002 — New Zealand
- Haplinis taranakii (Blest, 1979) — New Zealand
- Haplinis tegulata (Blest, 1979) — New Zealand
- Haplinis titan (Blest, 1979) — New Zealand
- Haplinis tokaanuae Blest & Vink, 2002 — New Zealand
- Haplinis wairarapa Blest & Vink, 2002 — New Zealand

== Haplomaro ==
Haplomaro Miller, 1970

- Haplomaro denisi Miller, 1970 — Angola

== Helophora ==
Helophora Menge, 1866

- Helophora insignis (Blackwall, 1841) (type species) — Holarctic
- Helophora kueideensis Hu, 2001 — China
- Helophora orinoma (Chamberlin, 1919) — USA
- Helophora reducta (Keyserling, 1886) — USA, Alaska
- Helophora tunagyna Chamberlin & Ivie, 1943 — USA

== Helsdingenia ==
Helsdingenia Saaristo & Tanasevitch, 2003

- Helsdingenia ceylonica (van Helsdingen, 1985) (type species) — Nepal, Sri Lanka
- Helsdingenia extensa (Locket, 1968) — St. Helena, Africa, Madagascar, Comoro Islands
- Helsdingenia hebes (Locket & Russell-Smith, 1980) — Nigeria, Cameroon
- Helsdingenia hebesoides Saaristo & Tanasevitch, 2003 — Sumatra

== Herbiphantes ==
Herbiphantes Tanasevitch, 1992

- Herbiphantes acutalis Irfan & Peng, 2019 — China
- Herbiphantes cericeus (Saito, 1934) — Russia, Korea, Japan
- Herbiphantes longiventris Tanasevitch, 1992 (type species) — Russia, Japan
- Herbiphantes pratensis Tanasevitch, 1992 — Russia

== Heterolinyphia ==
Heterolinyphia Wunderlich, 1973

- Heterolinyphia secunda Thaler, 1999 — Bhutan
- Heterolinyphia tarakotensis Wunderlich, 1973 (type species) — Nepal, Kashmir

== Heterotrichoncus ==
Heterotrichoncus Wunderlich, 1970

- Heterotrichoncus pusillus (Miller, 1958) — Austria, Czech Republic, Slovakia, Russia

== Hilaira ==
Hilaira Simon, 1884

- Hilaira asiatica Eskov, 1987 — Russia
- Hilaira banini Marusik & Tanasevitch, 2003 — Mongolia
- Hilaira canaliculata (Emerton, 1915) — Russia, USA, Canada
- Hilaira dapaensis Wunderlich, 1983 — Nepal
- Hilaira devitata Eskov, 1987 — Russia
- Hilaira excisa (O. P.-Cambridge, 1871) (type species) — Europe, Russia
- Hilaira gertschi Holm, 1960 — Wrangel Islands, Alaska
- Hilaira gibbosa Tanasevitch, 1982 — Russia, Mongolia, Canada
- Hilaira glacialis (Thorell, 1871) — Norway, Russia
- Hilaira herniosa (Thorell, 1875) — Holarctic
- Hilaira hyperborea (Kulczyński, 1908) - Russia
- Hilaira incondita (L. Koch, 1879) — Russia
- Hilaira jamalensis Eskov, 1981 — Russia
- Hilaira marusiki Eskov, 1987 — Russia, Mongolia
- Hilaira meridionalis Tanasevitch, 2013 — Russia
- Hilaira minuta Eskov, 1979 — Russia, Mongolia
- Hilaira nivalis Holm, 1937 — Russia
- Hilaira nubigena Hull, 1911 — Palearctic, Alaska
- Hilaira pelikena Eskov, 1987 — Russia
- Hilaira pervicax Hull, 1908 — Palearctic
- Hilaira proletaria (L. Koch, 1879) — Russia, Alaska
- Hilaira sibirica Eskov, 1987 — Russia, Mongolia, Canada
- Hilaira syrojeczkovskii Eskov, 1981 — Russia
- Hilaira tuberculifera Sha & Zhu, 1995 — China
- Hilaira vexatrix (O. P.-Cambridge, 1877) — Holarctic

== Himalaphantes ==
Himalaphantes Tanasevitch, 1992

- Himalaphantes azumiensis (Oi, 1979) — Russia, China, Japan
- Himalaphantes grandiculus (Tanasevitch, 1987) (type species) — Nepal
- Himalaphantes magnus (Tanasevitch, 1987) — Nepal
- Himalaphantes martensi (Thaler, 1987) — Kashmir, Nepal

== Holma ==
Holma Locket, 1974

- Holma bispicata Locket, 1974 — Angola

== Holmelgonia ==
Holmelgonia Jocque & Scharff, 2007

- Holmelgonia afromontana Nzigidahera & Jocqué, 2014
- Holmelgonia annemetteae (Scharff, 1990) — Tanzania
- Holmelgonia annulata (Jocque & Scharff, 1986) — Tanzania
- Holmelgonia basalis (Jocque & Scharff, 1986) — Tanzania
- Holmelgonia bosnasutus Nzigidahera & Jocqué, 2014 - Burundi
- Holmelgonia brachystegiae (Jocque, 1981) — Malawi
- Holmelgonia disconveniens Nzigidahera & Jocqué, 2014 - Burundi
- Holmelgonia falciformis (Scharff, 1990) — Tanzania
- Holmelgonia hirsuta (Miller, 1970) — Angola
- Holmelgonia holmi (Miller, 1970) — Cameroon, Congo
- Holmelgonia limpida (Miller, 1970) — Angola
- Holmelgonia nemoralis (Holm, 1962) (type species) — Congo, Uganda, Kenya
- Holmelgonia perturbatrix (Jocque & Scharff, 1986) — Tanzania
- Holmelgonia producta (Bosmans, 1988) — Cameroon
- Holmelgonia projecta (Jocque & Scharff, 1986) — Tanzania
- Holmelgonia rungwensis (Jocque & Scharff, 1986) — Tanzania
- Holmelgonia stoltzei (Jocque & Scharff, 1986) — Tanzania

== Holminaria ==
Holminaria Eskov, 1991

- Holminaria pallida Eskov, 1991 — Russia
- Holminaria prolata (O. P.-Cambridge, 1873) — Russia
- Holminaria sibirica Eskov, 1991 (type species) — Russia, Mongolia, China

== Horcotes ==
Horcotes Crosby & Bishop, 1933

- Horcotes quadricristatus (Emerton, 1882) (type species) — USA
- Horcotes strandi (Sytshevskaja, 1935) — Finland, Russia, Canada
- Horcotes uncinatus Barrows, 1945 — USA

== Houshenzinus ==
Houshenzinus Tanasevitch, 2006

- Houshenzinus rimosus Tanasevitch, 2006 (type species) — China
- Houshenzinus tengchongensis Irfan & Peng, 2018 - China
- Houshenzinus xiaolongha Zhao & Li, 2014 - China

== Hubertella ==
Hubertella Platnick, 1989

- Hubertella montana Tanasevitch, 2019 — Nepal
- Hubertella orientalis (Georgescu, 1977) (type species) — Nepal
- Hubertella thankurensis (Wunderlich, 1983) — Nepal

== Hybauchenidium ==
Hybauchenidium Holm, 1973

- Hybauchenidium aquilonare (L. Koch, 1879) (type species) — Russia, Alaska, Canada
- Hybauchenidium cymbadentatum (Crosby & Bishop, 1935) — USA
- Hybauchenidium ferrumequinum (Grube, 1861) — Sweden, Finland, Russia, Canada
- Hybauchenidium gibbosum (Sorensen, 1898) — Russia, Alaska, Canada, USA, Greenland

== Hybocoptus ==
Hybocoptus Simon, 1884

- Hybocoptus corrugis (O. P.-Cambridge, 1875) (type species) — Europe, Algeria, Morocco
- Hybocoptus dubius Denis, 1950 — France
- Hybocoptus ericicola (Simon, 1881) — France, Algeria

== Hylyphantes ==
Hylyphantes Simon, 1884

- Hylyphantes birmanicus (Thorell, 1895) — Myanmar
- Hylyphantes geniculatus Tu & Li, 2003 — China
- Hylyphantes graminicola (Sundevall, 1830) — Palearctic
- Hylyphantes nigritus (Simon, 1881) (type species) — Palearctic
- Hylyphantes spirellus Tu & Li, 2005 — China
- Hylyphantes tanikawai Ono & Saito, 2001 — Ryukyu Islands

== Hyperafroneta ==
Hyperafroneta Blest, 1979

- Hyperafroneta obscura Blest, 1979 — New Zealand

== Hypomma ==
Hypomma Dahl, 1886

- Hypomma affine Schenkel, 1930 — Russia, Japan
- Hypomma bituberculatum (Wider, 1834) (type species) — Palearctic
- Hypomma brevitibiale (Wunderlich, 1980) — Macedonia
- Hypomma clypeatum Roewer, 1942 — Bioko
- Hypomma coalescera (Kritscher, 1966) — New Caledonia
- Hypomma cornutum (Blackwall, 1833) — Palearctic
- Hypomma fulvum (Bösenberg, 1902) — Palearctic
- Hypomma marxi (Keyserling, 1886) — USA
- Hypomma nordlandicum Chamberlin & Ivie, 1947 — Alaska
- Hypomma subarcticum Chamberlin & Ivie, 1947 — Alaska

== Hypselistes ==
Hypselistes Simon, 1894

- Hypselistes acutidens Gao, Sha & Zhu, 1989 — China
- Hypselistes asiaticus Bösenberg & Strand, 1906 — Japan
- Hypselistes australis Saito & Ono, 2001 — Russia, Japan
- Hypselistes basarukini Marusik & Leech, 1993 — Russia
- Hypselistes florens (O. P.-Cambridge, 1875) (type species) — USA, Canada, possibly Britain
  - Hypselistes florens bulbiceps Chamberlin & Ivie, 1935 — USA
- Hypselistes fossilobus Fei & Zhu, 1993 — Russia, China
- Hypselistes jacksoni (O. P.-Cambridge, 1902) — Holarctic
- Hypselistes kolymensis Marusik & Leech, 1993 — Russia
- Hypselistes semiflavus (L. Koch, 1879) — Russia, Japan

== Hypselocara ==
Hypselocara Millidge, 1991

- Hypselocara altissimum (Simon, 1894) — Venezuela

== Hypsocephalus ==
Hypsocephalus Millidge, 1978

- Hypsocephalus huberti (Millidge, 1975) — Corsica
- Hypsocephalus nesiotes (Simon, 1914) — Corsica
- Hypsocephalus paulae (Simon, 1918) — France, Switzerland, Italy
- Hypsocephalus pusillus (Menge, 1869) (type species) — Europe, Ukraine

== See also ==
- List of Linyphiidae species (I–P)
- List of Linyphiidae species (Q–Z)
