= Dresconella =

Scientific classification
- Kingdom: Animalia
- Phylum: Arthropoda
- Subphylum: Chelicerata
- Class: Arachnida
- Order: Araneae
- Infraorder: Araneomorphae
- Family: Linyphiidae
- Genus: Dresconella; Denis, 1950
- Species: D. nivicola

Binomial name
- Dresconella nivicola (Simon, 1884)

Genus of spiders

Dresconella is a monotypic genus of Spanish dwarf spiders containing the single species, Dresconella nivicola. It was first described by J. Denis in 1950, and has only been found in France.
