= Graphomoa =

Scientific classification
- Kingdom: Animalia
- Phylum: Arthropoda
- Subphylum: Chelicerata
- Class: Arachnida
- Order: Araneae
- Infraorder: Araneomorphae
- Family: Linyphiidae
- Genus: Graphomoa; Chamberlin, 1924
- Species: G. theridioides

Binomial name
- Graphomoa theridioides Chamberlin, 1924

Genus of spiders

Graphomoa is a monotypic genus of North American dwarf spiders containing the single species, Graphomoa theridioides. It was first described by Ralph Vary Chamberlin in 1924, and has only been found in Alabama, Florida, Georgia, Louisiana, and Tennessee.
