= Agyneta rufidorsa =

Scientific classification
- Kingdom: Animalia
- Phylum: Arthropoda
- Subphylum: Chelicerata
- Class: Arachnida
- Order: Araneae
- Infraorder: Araneomorphae
- Family: Linyphiidae
- Genus: Agyneta
- Species: A. rufidorsa

Binomial name
- Agyneta rufidorsa (Denis, 1961)

Species of spider

Agyneta rufidorsa is a species of sheet weaver spider found in France. It was described by Jacques Denis in 1961.
