= Diastanillus =

Scientific classification
- Kingdom: Animalia
- Phylum: Arthropoda
- Subphylum: Chelicerata
- Class: Arachnida
- Order: Araneae
- Infraorder: Araneomorphae
- Family: Linyphiidae
- Genus: Diastanillus; Simon, 1926
- Species: D. pecuarius

Binomial name
- Diastanillus pecuarius (Simon, 1884)

Genus of spiders

Diastanillus is a monotypic genus of European dwarf spiders containing the single species, Diastanillus pecuarius. It was first described by Eugène Louis Simon in 1926, and has only been found in Austria, France, and Norway.
