= Gigapassus =

Scientific classification
- Kingdom: Animalia
- Phylum: Arthropoda
- Subphylum: Chelicerata
- Class: Arachnida
- Order: Araneae
- Infraorder: Araneomorphae
- Family: Linyphiidae
- Genus: Gigapassus; Miller, 2007
- Species: G. octarine

Binomial name
- Gigapassus octarine Miller, 2007

Genus of spiders

Gigapassus is a monotypic genus of South American dwarf spiders containing the single species, Gigapassus octarine. It was first described by J. A. Miller in 2007, and has only been found in Argentina.
