= Arachosinella =

Scientific classification
- Kingdom: Animalia
- Phylum: Arthropoda
- Subphylum: Chelicerata
- Class: Arachnida
- Order: Araneae
- Infraorder: Araneomorphae
- Family: Linyphiidae
- Genus: Arachosinella; Denis, 1958

Type species
- A. strepens Denis, 1958

Species
- A. oeroegensis Wunderlich, 1995 – Kazakhstan, Kyrgyzstan, Russia (South Siberia), Mongolia; A. strepens Denis, 1958 – Afghanistan

Genus of spiders

Arachosinella is a genus of Asian dwarf spiders that was first described by J. Denis in 1958. As of May 2019 it contains only two species from Russia and Central Asia: A. oeroegensis and A. strepens.
