= Estrandia =

Scientific classification
- Kingdom: Animalia
- Phylum: Arthropoda
- Subphylum: Chelicerata
- Class: Arachnida
- Order: Araneae
- Infraorder: Araneomorphae
- Family: Linyphiidae
- Genus: Estrandia; Blauvelt, 1936
- Species: E. grandaeva

Binomial name
- Estrandia grandaeva (Keyserling, 1886)

Genus of spiders

Estrandia is a monotypic genus of dwarf spiders containing the single species, Estrandia grandaeva. It was first described by H. H. Blauvelt in 1936, and has only been found in China, Japan, and Russia.
