= Gibbafroneta =

Scientific classification
- Kingdom: Animalia
- Phylum: Arthropoda
- Subphylum: Chelicerata
- Class: Arachnida
- Order: Araneae
- Infraorder: Araneomorphae
- Family: Linyphiidae
- Genus: Gibbafroneta; Merrett, 2004
- Species: G. gibbosa

Binomial name
- Gibbafroneta gibbosa Merrett, 2004

Genus of spiders

Gibbafroneta is a monotypic genus of Central African dwarf spiders containing the single species, Gibbafroneta gibbosa. It was first described by P. Merrett in 2004, and has only been found in Middle Africa.
