= Afromynoglenes =

Scientific classification
- Kingdom: Animalia
- Phylum: Arthropoda
- Subphylum: Chelicerata
- Class: Arachnida
- Order: Araneae
- Infraorder: Araneomorphae
- Family: Linyphiidae
- Genus: Afromynoglenes; Merrett & Russell-Smith, 1996
- Species: A. parkeri

Binomial name
- Afromynoglenes parkeri Merrett & Russell-Smith, 1996

Genus of spiders

Afromynoglenes is a monotypic genus of East African dwarf spiders containing the single species, Afromynoglenes parkeri. It was first described by P. Merrett & A. Russell-Smith in 1996, and has only been found in Ethiopia.
