= Falklandoglenes =

Scientific classification
- Kingdom: Animalia
- Phylum: Arthropoda
- Subphylum: Chelicerata
- Class: Arachnida
- Order: Araneae
- Infraorder: Araneomorphae
- Family: Linyphiidae
- Genus: Falklandoglenes; Usher, 1983

Type species
- Falklandoglenes spinosa Usher, 1983

Species
- 4, see text

Genus of spiders

Falklandoglenes is a genus of South American dwarf spiders that was first described by M. B. Usher in 1983.

== Species ==
As of March 2023 it contains four species, all found in the Falkland Islands:

- Falklandoglenes hadassa Lavery & Snazell, 2023 – Falkland Is.
- Falklandoglenes iasonum Lavery & Snazell, 2023 – Falkland Is.
- Falklandoglenes spinosa Usher, 1983 (type) – Falkland Is.
- Falklandoglenes weddelli Lavery & Snazell, 2023 – Falkland Is.
