= Conglin =

Scientific classification
- Domain: Eukaryota
- Kingdom: Animalia
- Phylum: Arthropoda
- Subphylum: Chelicerata
- Class: Arachnida
- Order: Araneae
- Infraorder: Araneomorphae
- Family: Linyphiidae
- Genus: Conglin
- Species: C. personatus

Binomial name
- Conglin personatus Zhao & Li, 2014

Genus of spiders

Conglin is a genus of spiders in the family Linyphiidae. It was first described in 2014 by Zhao & Li. As of 2017, it contains only one species, Conglin personatus, found in China.
