= Gladiata =

Scientific classification
- Domain: Eukaryota
- Kingdom: Animalia
- Phylum: Arthropoda
- Subphylum: Chelicerata
- Class: Arachnida
- Order: Araneae
- Infraorder: Araneomorphae
- Family: Linyphiidae
- Genus: Gladiata
- Species: G. fengli

Binomial name
- Gladiata fengli Zhao & Li, 2014

Genus of spiders

Gladiata is a genus of spiders in the family Linyphiidae. It was first described in 2014 by Zhao & Li. As of 2017, it contains only one species, Gladiata fengli, found in China.
