= Camafroneta =

Scientific classification
- Domain: Eukaryota
- Kingdom: Animalia
- Phylum: Arthropoda
- Subphylum: Chelicerata
- Class: Arachnida
- Order: Araneae
- Infraorder: Araneomorphae
- Family: Linyphiidae
- Genus: Camafroneta; Frick & Scharff, 2018
- Species: C. oku

Binomial name
- Camafroneta oku Frick & Scharff, 2018

Genus of spiders

Camafroneta is a genus of dwarf spiders containing the single species, Camafroneta oku. It was first described by H. Frick & N. Scharff in 2018, and is only found in Cameroon.
