= Didectoprocnemis =

Scientific classification
- Kingdom: Animalia
- Phylum: Arthropoda
- Subphylum: Chelicerata
- Class: Arachnida
- Order: Araneae
- Infraorder: Araneomorphae
- Family: Linyphiidae
- Genus: Didectoprocnemis; Denis, 1950
- Species: D. cirtensis

Binomial name
- Didectoprocnemis cirtensis (Simon, 1884)

Genus of spiders

Didectoprocnemis is a monotypic genus of dwarf spiders containing the single species, Didectoprocnemis cirtensis. It was first described by J. Denis in 1950, and has only been found in Algeria, France, Greece, Morocco, Portugal, and Tunisia.
