= Apobrata =

Scientific classification
- Kingdom: Animalia
- Phylum: Arthropoda
- Subphylum: Chelicerata
- Class: Arachnida
- Order: Araneae
- Infraorder: Araneomorphae
- Family: Linyphiidae
- Genus: Apobrata; Miller, 2004
- Species: A. scutila

Binomial name
- Apobrata scutila (Simon, 1894)

Genus of spiders

Apobrata is a monotypic genus of Southeast Asian dwarf spiders containing the single species, Apobrata scutila. It was first described by J. A. Miller in 2004, and has only been found in the Philippines.
