= Cherserigone =

Scientific classification
- Kingdom: Animalia
- Phylum: Arthropoda
- Subphylum: Chelicerata
- Class: Arachnida
- Order: Araneae
- Infraorder: Araneomorphae
- Family: Linyphiidae
- Genus: Cherserigone; Denis, 1954
- Species: C. gracilipes

Binomial name
- Cherserigone gracilipes Denis, 1954

Genus of spiders

Cherserigone is a monotypic genus of North African dwarf spiders containing the single species, Cherserigone gracilipes. It was first described by J. Denis in 1954, and has only been found in Algeria.
