= Ceratocyba =

Scientific classification
- Kingdom: Animalia
- Phylum: Arthropoda
- Subphylum: Chelicerata
- Class: Arachnida
- Order: Araneae
- Infraorder: Araneomorphae
- Family: Linyphiidae
- Genus: Ceratocyba; Holm, 1962
- Species: C. umbilicaris

Binomial name
- Ceratocyba umbilicaris Holm, 1962

Genus of spiders

Ceratocyba is a monotypic genus of East African dwarf spiders containing the single species, Ceratocyba umbilicaris. It was first described by Å. Holm in 1962, and has only been found in Kenya.
