= Agyneta adami =

Scientific classification
- Kingdom: Animalia
- Phylum: Arthropoda
- Subphylum: Chelicerata
- Class: Arachnida
- Order: Araneae
- Infraorder: Araneomorphae
- Family: Linyphiidae
- Genus: Agyneta
- Species: A. adami

Binomial name
- Agyneta adami (Millidge, 1991)

Synonyms
- Meioneta adami Millidge, 1991

Species of spider

Agyneta adami is a species of sheet weaver found in Brazil. It was described in 1991 by Alfred Frank Millidge based on two females collected from Manaus, Brazil. Initially placed in the genus Meioneta, it was transferred to Agyneta when Nadine Dupérré synonymized the two genera in 2013. The specific epithet adami refers to the collector of the type specimen.

== Description ==
Female Agyneta adami have a brown cephalothorax with black margins. The abdomen is dorsally grey with a white spot in front of the spinnerets and is whitish ventrally. The sternum is yellow-brown and suffused with black. The legs are mostly yellow. The epigynum resembles that of the species Agyneta prima, Agyneta proxima, and Agyneta mediocris. However, it can be distinguished by the narrow basal part of the scape, with a wide atrium on either side filled by the translucent distal part of the scape.

Male Agyneta adami have a brown cephalothorax with dark-brown dots, and a brown sternum. The eyes are margined with black, and the labium is brown. The cheliceral front margin and hind margin have three teeth. The legs are yellow and covered in dark-brown dots. The abdomen is longer than wide, yellow dorsally and brown underneath and on the sides. The palp has the mesal apophysis and embolus pointed distally, resembling the species Agyneta straminicola. It can be distinguished from this species by the ventrally elongated lamella characteristica and the presence of four basal apophyses on the lower dorsal cymbium.
