= Agyneta muriensis =

Scientific classification
- Domain: Eukaryota
- Kingdom: Animalia
- Phylum: Arthropoda
- Subphylum: Chelicerata
- Class: Arachnida
- Order: Araneae
- Infraorder: Araneomorphae
- Family: Linyphiidae
- Genus: Agyneta
- Species: A. muriensis

Binomial name
- Agyneta muriensis Wunderlich, 1983

Species of spider

Agyneta muriensis is a species of sheet weaver found in Nepal. It was described by Wunderlich in 1983.
