= Agyneta fuscipalpa =

Scientific classification
- Kingdom: Animalia
- Phylum: Arthropoda
- Subphylum: Chelicerata
- Class: Arachnida
- Order: Araneae
- Infraorder: Araneomorphae
- Family: Linyphiidae
- Genus: Agyneta
- Species: A. fuscipalpa

Binomial name
- Agyneta fuscipalpa (C. L. Koch, 1836)

Species of spider

Agyneta fuscipalpa is a species of sheet weaver spider found in the Palearctic. It was described by C. L. Koch in 1836.

== Distribution ==
Fuscipalpa has a wide range across Cape Verde, the Azores, North Africa, Europe, Turkey, the Caucasus, Russia (from Europe to South Siberia), Iran, Kazakhstan, and Central Asia, but is not commonly seen. It was recorded for the first time in Turkey in 2025, and in the Netherlands the same year.

The only British records of the spider are from a single site at RAF Mildenhall in West Suffolk.

== Habitat ==
Fuscipalpa is typically found in damp places, and occasionally on tree trunks. However, the British specimens were found in calcareous grass heath in Breckland, and more recent records from Germany and Belgium suggest open, sandy habitats are the more usual habitat for the species.
