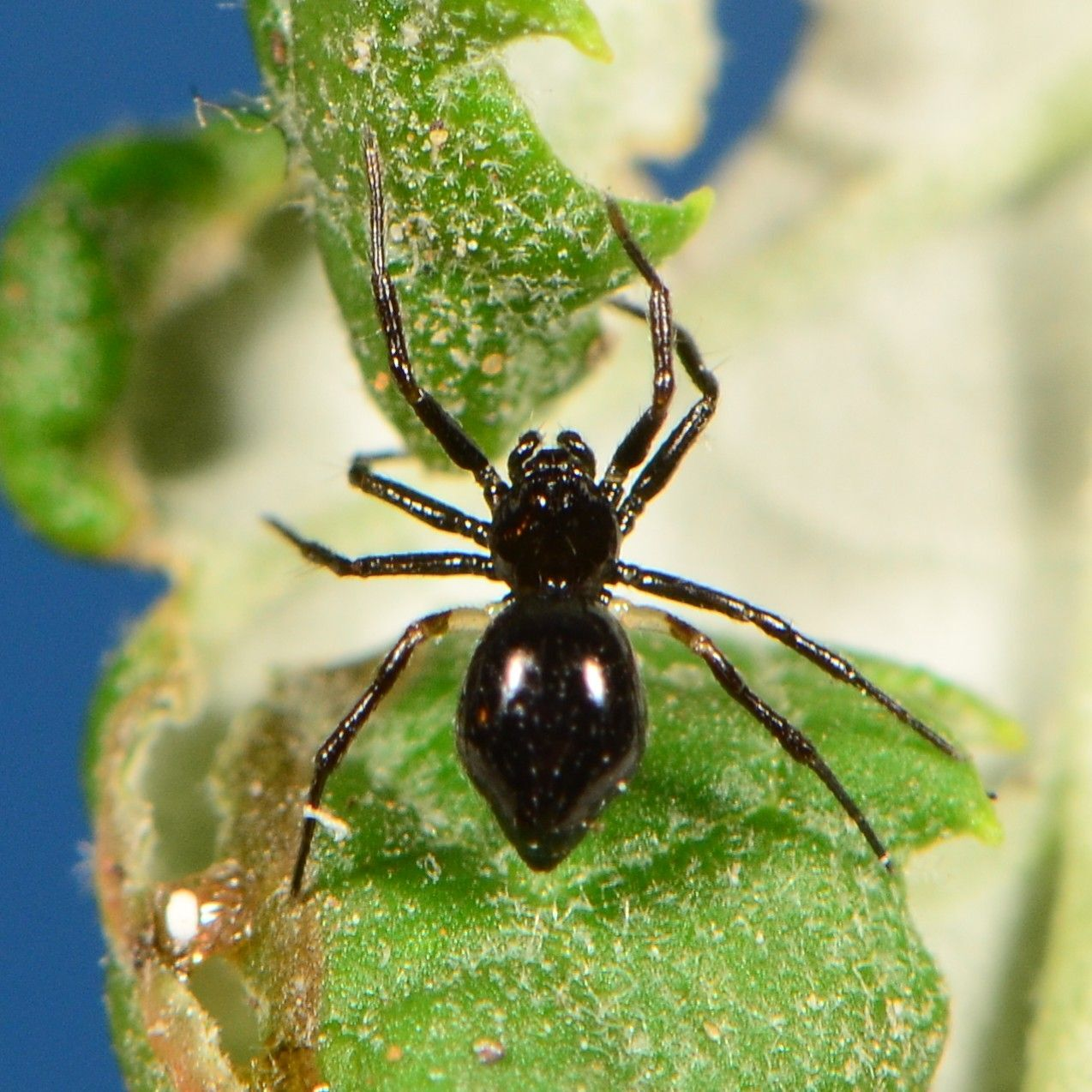
- female
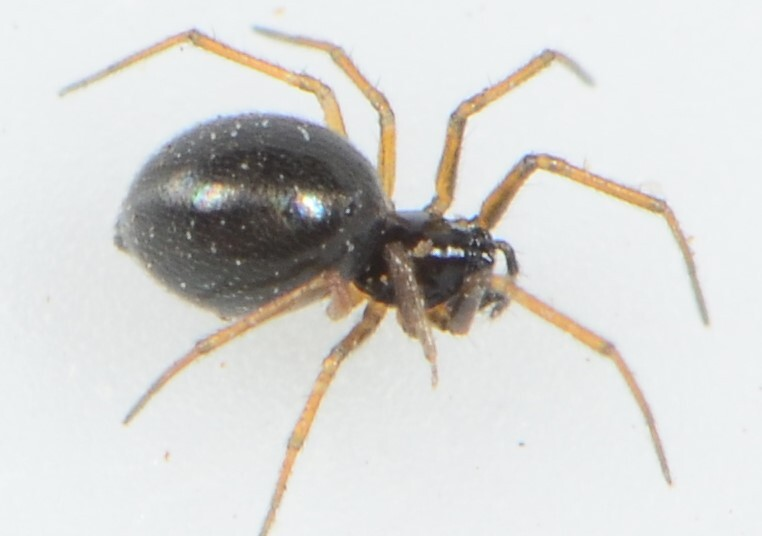
- female

Scientific classification
- Kingdom: Animalia
- Phylum: Arthropoda
- Subphylum: Chelicerata
- Class: Arachnida
- Order: Araneae
- Infraorder: Araneomorphae
- Family: Linyphiidae
- Genus: Agyneta
- Species: A. habra

Binomial name
- Agyneta habra (Locket, 1968)

= Agyneta habra =

Species of spider

Agyneta habra is a species of sheet weaver found in Africa. It was described by Locket in 1968.
