= Agyneta levis =

Scientific classification
- Domain: Eukaryota
- Kingdom: Animalia
- Phylum: Arthropoda
- Subphylum: Chelicerata
- Class: Arachnida
- Order: Araneae
- Infraorder: Araneomorphae
- Family: Linyphiidae
- Genus: Agyneta
- Species: A. levis

Binomial name
- Agyneta levis (Locket, 1968)

Species of spider

Agyneta levis is a species of sheet weaver found in Angola. It was described by Locket in 1968.
