= Agyneta merretti =

Scientific classification
- Kingdom: Animalia
- Phylum: Arthropoda
- Subphylum: Chelicerata
- Class: Arachnida
- Order: Araneae
- Infraorder: Araneomorphae
- Family: Linyphiidae
- Genus: Agyneta
- Species: A. merretti

Binomial name
- Agyneta merretti (Locket, 1968)

Synonyms
- Meioneta merretti Locket, 1968

Species of spider

Agyneta merretti is a species of spider in the family Linyphiidae (sheet weavers) found in Angola. It was described by G. H. Locket in 1968.
