= Batueta =

Scientific classification
- Kingdom: Animalia
- Phylum: Arthropoda
- Subphylum: Chelicerata
- Class: Arachnida
- Order: Araneae
- Infraorder: Araneomorphae
- Family: Linyphiidae
- Genus: Batueta; Locket, 1982

Type species
- B. voluta Locket, 1982

Species
- 4, see text

Genus of spiders

Batueta is a genus of Asian dwarf spiders that was first described by G. H. Locket in 1982.

== Species ==
As of May 2019 it contains four species:

- Batueta baculum Tanasevitch, 2014 – Laos, Thailand, Malaysia (Mainland, Borneo), Indonesia (Sumatra)
- Batueta cuspidata Zhao & Li, 2014 – China
- Batueta similis Wunderlich & Song, 1995 – China
- Batueta voluta Locket, 1982 (type) – Laos, Vietnam, Thailand, Malaysia, Singapore
