= Agyneta tenuipes =

Scientific classification
- Domain: Eukaryota
- Kingdom: Animalia
- Phylum: Arthropoda
- Subphylum: Chelicerata
- Class: Arachnida
- Order: Araneae
- Infraorder: Araneomorphae
- Family: Linyphiidae
- Genus: Agyneta
- Species: A. tenuipes

Binomial name
- Agyneta tenuipes (Ono, 2007)

Species of spider

Agyneta tenuipes is a species of sheet weaver found in Japan. It was described by Ono in 2007.
