= Agyneta allosubtilis =

Conservation status
- Secure (NatureServe)

Scientific classification
- Kingdom: Animalia
- Phylum: Arthropoda
- Subphylum: Chelicerata
- Class: Arachnida
- Order: Araneae
- Infraorder: Araneomorphae
- Family: Linyphiidae
- Genus: Agyneta
- Species: A. allosubtilis

Binomial name
- Agyneta allosubtilis Loksa, 1965

Species of spider

Agyneta allosubtilis is a species of sheet weaver found in the Holarctic. It was described by Loksa in 1965.
