= Agyneta cauta =

Scientific classification
- Domain: Eukaryota
- Kingdom: Animalia
- Phylum: Arthropoda
- Subphylum: Chelicerata
- Class: Arachnida
- Order: Araneae
- Infraorder: Araneomorphae
- Family: Linyphiidae
- Genus: Agyneta
- Species: A. cauta

Binomial name
- Agyneta cauta (O.P.-Cambridge, 1902)

Species of spider

Agyneta cauta is a species of sheet weaver found in the Palearctic. It was described by O.P.-Cambridge in 1902.
