= Agyneta depigmentata =

Scientific classification
- Domain: Eukaryota
- Kingdom: Animalia
- Phylum: Arthropoda
- Subphylum: Chelicerata
- Class: Arachnida
- Order: Araneae
- Infraorder: Araneomorphae
- Family: Linyphiidae
- Genus: Agyneta
- Species: A. depigmentata

Binomial name
- Agyneta depigmentata Wunderlich, 2008

Species of spider

Agyneta depigmentata is a species of sheet weaver found in the Azores. It was described by Wunderlich in 2008.
