= Agyneta simplex =

Conservation status
- Secure (NatureServe)

Scientific classification
- Kingdom: Animalia
- Phylum: Arthropoda
- Subphylum: Chelicerata
- Class: Arachnida
- Order: Araneae
- Infraorder: Araneomorphae
- Family: Linyphiidae
- Genus: Agyneta
- Species: A. simplex

Binomial name
- Agyneta simplex (Emerton, 1926)

Species of spider

Agyneta simplex is a species of sheet weaver found in Canada and the United States. It was described by Emerton in 1926.
