= Agyneta okefenokee =

Scientific classification
- Domain: Eukaryota
- Kingdom: Animalia
- Phylum: Arthropoda
- Subphylum: Chelicerata
- Class: Arachnida
- Order: Araneae
- Infraorder: Araneomorphae
- Family: Linyphiidae
- Genus: Agyneta
- Species: A. okefenokee

Binomial name
- Agyneta okefenokee Dupérré, 2013

Species of spider

Agyneta okefenokee is a species of sheet weaver discovered in the United States. It can be found in the Okefenokee Swamp, Georgia. It was described by Dupérré in 2013.

== Etymology ==
The name is a noun in apposition taken from the location Okefenokee Swamp.
