= Agyneta alboguttata =

Scientific classification
- Domain: Eukaryota
- Kingdom: Animalia
- Phylum: Arthropoda
- Subphylum: Chelicerata
- Class: Arachnida
- Order: Araneae
- Infraorder: Araneomorphae
- Family: Linyphiidae
- Genus: Agyneta
- Species: A. alboguttata

Binomial name
- Agyneta alboguttata (Jocque, 1985)

Species of spider

Agyneta alboguttata is a species of sheet weaver found in the Comoro Islands. It was described by Jocque in 1985.
