= Agyneta trifurcata =

Scientific classification
- Domain: Eukaryota
- Kingdom: Animalia
- Phylum: Arthropoda
- Subphylum: Chelicerata
- Class: Arachnida
- Order: Araneae
- Infraorder: Araneomorphae
- Family: Linyphiidae
- Genus: Agyneta
- Species: A. trifurcata

Binomial name
- Agyneta trifurcata Hippa & Oksala, 1985

Species of spider

Agyneta trifurcata is a species of sheet weaver found in Finland and Russia. It was described by Hippa & Oksala in 1985.

They are often found in birch forests.
