= Agyneta nigra =

Scientific classification
- Kingdom: Animalia
- Phylum: Arthropoda
- Subphylum: Chelicerata
- Class: Arachnida
- Order: Araneae
- Infraorder: Araneomorphae
- Family: Linyphiidae
- Genus: Agyneta
- Species: A. nigra

Binomial name
- Agyneta nigra (Oi, 1960)

Species of spider

Agyneta nigra is a species of sheet weaver found in China, Japan, Korea, Mongolia and Russia. It was described by Oi in 1960.
