= Agyneta brusnewi =

Scientific classification
- Domain: Eukaryota
- Kingdom: Animalia
- Phylum: Arthropoda
- Subphylum: Chelicerata
- Class: Arachnida
- Order: Araneae
- Infraorder: Araneomorphae
- Family: Linyphiidae
- Genus: Agyneta
- Species: A. brusnewi

Binomial name
- Agyneta brusnewi (Kulczyński, 1908)

Species of spider

Agyneta brusnewi is a species of sheet weaver found in Russia. It was described by Kulczyński in 1908.
