= Agyneta mossica =

Scientific classification
- Domain: Eukaryota
- Kingdom: Animalia
- Phylum: Arthropoda
- Subphylum: Chelicerata
- Class: Arachnida
- Order: Araneae
- Infraorder: Araneomorphae
- Family: Linyphiidae
- Genus: Agyneta
- Species: A. mossica

Binomial name
- Agyneta mossica (Schikora, 1993)

Species of spider

Agyneta mossica is a species of sheet weaver found in Europe. It was described by Schikora in 1993.
