= Agyneta tianschanica =

Scientific classification
- Kingdom: Animalia
- Phylum: Arthropoda
- Subphylum: Chelicerata
- Class: Arachnida
- Order: Araneae
- Infraorder: Araneomorphae
- Family: Linyphiidae
- Genus: Agyneta
- Species: A. tianschanica

Binomial name
- Agyneta tianschanica Tanasevitch, 1989

Species of spider

Agyneta tianschanica is a species of sheet weaver found in Kyrgyzstan. It was described by Tanasevitch in 1989.
