= Agyneta suecica =

Scientific classification
- Domain: Eukaryota
- Kingdom: Animalia
- Phylum: Arthropoda
- Subphylum: Chelicerata
- Class: Arachnida
- Order: Araneae
- Infraorder: Araneomorphae
- Family: Linyphiidae
- Genus: Agyneta
- Species: A. suecica

Binomial name
- Agyneta suecica Holm, 1950

Species of spider

Agyneta suecica is a species of sheet weaver spider found in Finland and Sweden. It was described by Holm in 1950.
