= Agyneta vera =

Scientific classification
- Kingdom: Animalia
- Phylum: Arthropoda
- Subphylum: Chelicerata
- Class: Arachnida
- Order: Araneae
- Infraorder: Araneomorphae
- Family: Linyphiidae
- Genus: Agyneta
- Species: A. vera

Binomial name
- Agyneta vera Wunderlich, 1976

Species of spider

Agyneta vera is a species of sheet weaver found in Queensland, Australia. It was described by Wunderlich in 1976.
