= Agyneta amersaxatilis =

Scientific classification
- Kingdom: Animalia
- Phylum: Arthropoda
- Subphylum: Chelicerata
- Class: Arachnida
- Order: Araneae
- Infraorder: Araneomorphae
- Family: Linyphiidae
- Genus: Agyneta
- Species: A. amersaxatilis

Binomial name
- Agyneta amersaxatilis Saaristo & Koponen, 1998

Species of spider

Agyneta amersaxatilis is a species of sheet weaver spider found in Russia, Canada, Alaska, and the continental United States. It was described by Saaristo & Koponen in 1998.
