= Agyneta subnivalis =

Scientific classification
- Kingdom: Animalia
- Phylum: Arthropoda
- Subphylum: Chelicerata
- Class: Arachnida
- Order: Araneae
- Infraorder: Araneomorphae
- Family: Linyphiidae
- Genus: Agyneta
- Species: A. subnivalis

Binomial name
- Agyneta subnivalis Tanasevitch, 1989

Species of spider

Agyneta subnivalis is a species of sheet weaver found in Central Asia. It was described by Tanasevitch in 1989.
