= Agyneta bucklei =

Scientific classification
- Kingdom: Animalia
- Phylum: Arthropoda
- Subphylum: Chelicerata
- Class: Arachnida
- Order: Araneae
- Infraorder: Araneomorphae
- Family: Linyphiidae
- Genus: Agyneta
- Species: A. bucklei

Binomial name
- Agyneta bucklei Dupérré, 2013

Species of spider

Agyneta bucklei is a species of sheet weaver spider found in the United States and Canada. It was described by Dupérré in 2013.
