= Agyneta barrowsi =

Scientific classification
- Kingdom: Animalia
- Phylum: Arthropoda
- Subphylum: Chelicerata
- Class: Arachnida
- Order: Araneae
- Infraorder: Araneomorphae
- Family: Linyphiidae
- Genus: Agyneta
- Species: A. barrowsi

Binomial name
- Agyneta barrowsi (Chamberlin & Ivie, 1944)

Species of spider

Agyneta barrowsi is a species of sheet weaver found in the United States and Canada. It was described by Chamberlin & Ivie in 1944.
