= Agyneta darrelli =

Scientific classification
- Domain: Eukaryota
- Kingdom: Animalia
- Phylum: Arthropoda
- Subphylum: Chelicerata
- Class: Arachnida
- Order: Araneae
- Infraorder: Araneomorphae
- Family: Linyphiidae
- Genus: Agyneta
- Species: A. darrelli

Binomial name
- Agyneta darrelli Dupérré, 2013

Species of spider

Agyneta darrelli is a species of sheet weaver found in Canada and the United States. It was described by Dupérré in 2013. The species was named after arachnologist Darrell Ubick.
