= Agyneta punctata =

Scientific classification
- Domain: Eukaryota
- Kingdom: Animalia
- Phylum: Arthropoda
- Subphylum: Chelicerata
- Class: Arachnida
- Order: Araneae
- Infraorder: Araneomorphae
- Family: Linyphiidae
- Genus: Agyneta
- Species: A. punctata

Binomial name
- Agyneta punctata Wunderlich, 2005

Species of spider

Agyneta punctata is a species of sheet weaver found in Greece and Turkey. It was described by Wunderlich in 2005.
