= Agyneta dynica =

Scientific classification
- Kingdom: Animalia
- Phylum: Arthropoda
- Subphylum: Chelicerata
- Class: Arachnida
- Order: Araneae
- Infraorder: Araneomorphae
- Family: Linyphiidae
- Genus: Agyneta
- Species: A. dynica

Binomial name
- Agyneta dynica Saaristo & Koponen, 1998

Species of spider

Agyneta dynica is a species of sheet weavers found in Canada and the United States. It was described by Saaristo & Koponen in 1998.
