= Agyneta iranica =

Scientific classification
- Kingdom: Animalia
- Phylum: Arthropoda
- Subphylum: Chelicerata
- Class: Arachnida
- Order: Araneae
- Infraorder: Araneomorphae
- Family: Linyphiidae
- Genus: Agyneta
- Species: A. iranica

Binomial name
- Agyneta iranica Tanasevitch, 2011

Species of spider

Agyneta iranica is a species of sheet weaver spider (family Linyphiidae) found in Iran. It was first described by Tanasevitch in 2011.
