= Agyneta fratrella =

Scientific classification
- Domain: Eukaryota
- Kingdom: Animalia
- Phylum: Arthropoda
- Subphylum: Chelicerata
- Class: Arachnida
- Order: Araneae
- Infraorder: Araneomorphae
- Family: Linyphiidae
- Genus: Agyneta
- Species: A. fratrella

Binomial name
- Agyneta fratrella (Chamberlin, 1919)

Species of spider in the family Linyphiidae

Agyneta fratrella is a species of sheet weaver found in the United States. It was described by Chamberlin in 1919.
