= Agyneta palustris =

Scientific classification
- Domain: Eukaryota
- Kingdom: Animalia
- Phylum: Arthropoda
- Subphylum: Chelicerata
- Class: Arachnida
- Order: Araneae
- Infraorder: Araneomorphae
- Family: Linyphiidae
- Genus: Agyneta
- Species: A. palustris

Binomial name
- Agyneta palustris (S.-Q. Li & C.-D. Zhu, 1995)

Species of spider

Agyneta palustris is a species of sheet weaver found in China. It was described by Shu-Qiang Li and Chuan-Dian Zhu in 1995.
