= Agyneta manni =

Scientific classification
- Domain: Eukaryota
- Kingdom: Animalia
- Phylum: Arthropoda
- Subphylum: Chelicerata
- Class: Arachnida
- Order: Araneae
- Infraorder: Araneomorphae
- Family: Linyphiidae
- Genus: Agyneta
- Species: A. manni

Binomial name
- Agyneta manni (Crawford & Edwards, 1989)

Species of spider

Agyneta manni is a species of sheet weaver found in the United States. It was described by Crawford & Edwards in 1989.
