= Agyneta sheffordiana =

Scientific classification
- Domain: Eukaryota
- Kingdom: Animalia
- Phylum: Arthropoda
- Subphylum: Chelicerata
- Class: Arachnida
- Order: Araneae
- Infraorder: Araneomorphae
- Family: Linyphiidae
- Genus: Agyneta
- Species: A. sheffordiana

Binomial name
- Agyneta sheffordiana Duperre & Paquin, 2007

Species of spider

Agyneta sheffordiana is a species of sheet weaver found in Canada. It was described by Duperre & Paquin in 2007.
