= Agyneta jacksoni =

Conservation status
- Secure (NatureServe)

Scientific classification
- Kingdom: Animalia
- Phylum: Arthropoda
- Subphylum: Chelicerata
- Class: Arachnida
- Order: Araneae
- Infraorder: Araneomorphae
- Family: Linyphiidae
- Genus: Agyneta
- Species: A. jacksoni

Binomial name
- Agyneta jacksoni (Braendegaard, 1937)

Species of spider

Agyneta jacksoni is a species of sheet weavers found in Canada, Greenland and the United States. It was described by Braendegaard in 1937.
