= Agyneta saxatilis =

Scientific classification
- Domain: Eukaryota
- Kingdom: Animalia
- Phylum: Arthropoda
- Subphylum: Chelicerata
- Class: Arachnida
- Order: Araneae
- Infraorder: Araneomorphae
- Family: Linyphiidae
- Genus: Agyneta
- Species: A. saxatilis

Binomial name
- Agyneta saxatilis (Blackwall, 1844)

Species of spider

Agyneta saxatilis is a species of sheet weaver found in Europe and Russia. It was described by Blackwall in 1844.
