= Agyneta maritima =

Scientific classification
- Domain: Eukaryota
- Kingdom: Animalia
- Phylum: Arthropoda
- Subphylum: Chelicerata
- Class: Arachnida
- Order: Araneae
- Infraorder: Araneomorphae
- Family: Linyphiidae
- Genus: Agyneta
- Species: A. maritima

Binomial name
- Agyneta maritima (Emerton, 1919)

Species of spider

Agyneta maritima is a species of sheet weaver found in Alaska, Canada, Mongolia and Russia. It was described by Emerton in 1919.
