= Agyneta emertoni =

Scientific classification
- Domain: Eukaryota
- Kingdom: Animalia
- Phylum: Arthropoda
- Subphylum: Chelicerata
- Class: Arachnida
- Order: Araneae
- Infraorder: Araneomorphae
- Family: Linyphiidae
- Genus: Agyneta
- Species: A. emertoni

Binomial name
- Agyneta emertoni (Roewer, 1942)

Species of spider

Agyneta emertoni is a species of sheet weaver found in Canada. It was described by Carl Friedrich Roewer in 1942 and named after American arachnologist James Henry Emerton.
