= Agyneta curvata =

Scientific classification
- Domain: Eukaryota
- Kingdom: Animalia
- Phylum: Arthropoda
- Subphylum: Chelicerata
- Class: Arachnida
- Order: Araneae
- Infraorder: Araneomorphae
- Family: Linyphiidae
- Genus: Agyneta
- Species: A. curvata

Binomial name
- Agyneta curvata (Bosmans, 1979)

Species of spider

Agyneta curvata is a species of sheet weaver found in Kenya. It was described by Bosmans in 1979.
