= Agyneta ramosa =

Scientific classification
- Domain: Eukaryota
- Kingdom: Animalia
- Phylum: Arthropoda
- Subphylum: Chelicerata
- Class: Arachnida
- Order: Araneae
- Infraorder: Araneomorphae
- Family: Linyphiidae
- Genus: Agyneta
- Species: A. ramosa

Binomial name
- Agyneta ramosa Jackson, 1912

Species of spider

Agyneta ramosa is a species of sheet weaver found in the Palearctic. It was described by Jackson in 1912.
