= Agyneta nigripes =

Scientific classification
- Kingdom: Animalia
- Phylum: Arthropoda
- Subphylum: Chelicerata
- Class: Arachnida
- Order: Araneae
- Infraorder: Araneomorphae
- Family: Linyphiidae
- Genus: Agyneta
- Species: A. nigripes

Binomial name
- Agyneta nigripes (Simon, 1884)

Species of spider

Agyneta nigripes is a species of sheet weaver found in Canada, Greenland and the Palearctic. It was described by Simon in 1884.
