= Agyneta prosectoides =

Scientific classification
- Kingdom: Animalia
- Phylum: Arthropoda
- Subphylum: Chelicerata
- Class: Arachnida
- Order: Araneae
- Infraorder: Araneomorphae
- Family: Linyphiidae
- Genus: Agyneta
- Species: A. prosectoides

Binomial name
- Agyneta prosectoides (Locket & Russell-Smith, 1980)

Species of spider

Agyneta prosectoides is a species of sheet weaver found in Cameroon and Nigeria. It was described by Locket & Russell-Smith in 1980.
