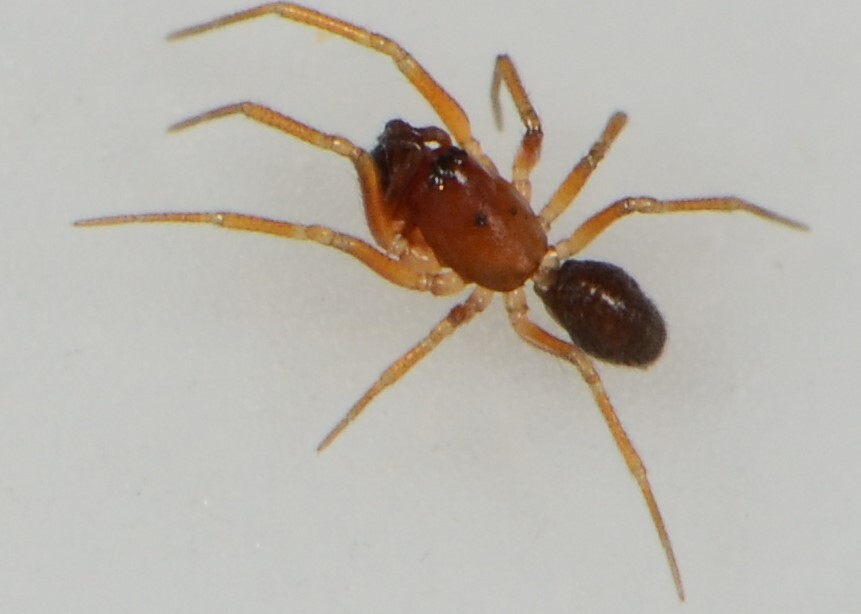
- male
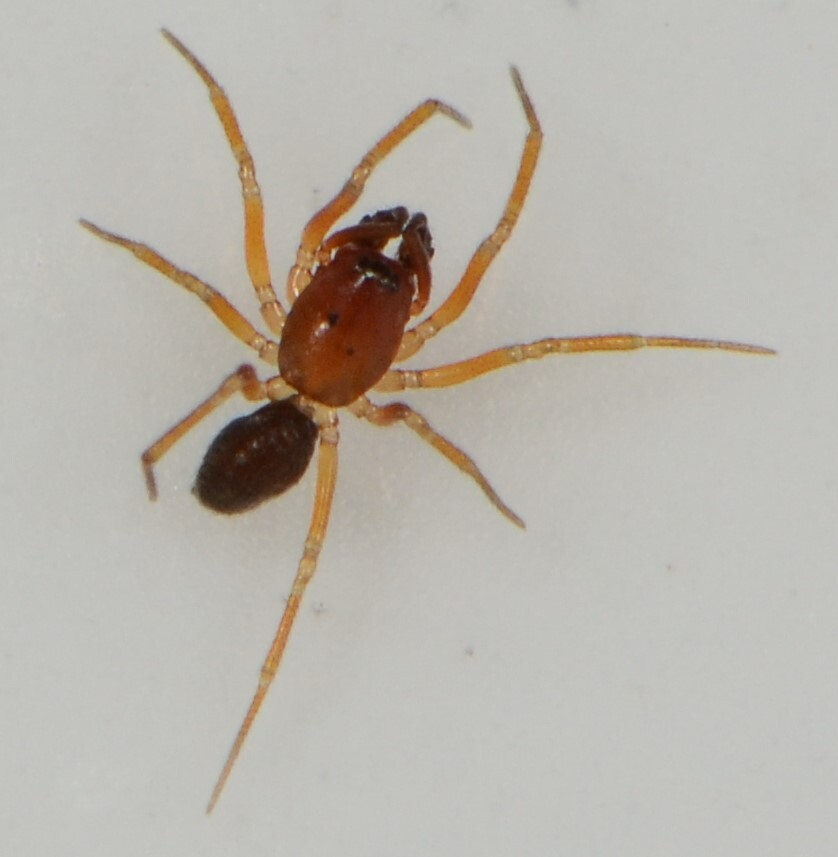
- male

Scientific classification
- Kingdom: Animalia
- Phylum: Arthropoda
- Subphylum: Chelicerata
- Class: Arachnida
- Order: Araneae
- Infraorder: Araneomorphae
- Family: Linyphiidae
- Genus: Agyneta
- Species: A. natalensis

Binomial name
- Agyneta natalensis (Jocque, 1984)

= Agyneta natalensis =

Species of spider

Agyneta natalensis is a species of sheet weaver found in South Africa. It was described by Jocque in 1984.
