= Agyneta ordinaria =

Scientific classification
- Kingdom: Animalia
- Phylum: Arthropoda
- Subphylum: Chelicerata
- Class: Arachnida
- Order: Araneae
- Infraorder: Araneomorphae
- Family: Linyphiidae
- Genus: Agyneta
- Species: A. ordinaria

Binomial name
- Agyneta ordinaria (Chamberlin & Ivie, 1947)

Species of spider

Agyneta ordinaria is a species of sheet weaver found in Canada and the United States. It was described by Chamberlin & Ivie in 1947.
