= Agyneta kopetdaghensis =

Scientific classification
- Kingdom: Animalia
- Phylum: Arthropoda
- Subphylum: Chelicerata
- Class: Arachnida
- Order: Araneae
- Infraorder: Araneomorphae
- Family: Linyphiidae
- Genus: Agyneta
- Species: A. kopetdaghensis

Binomial name
- Agyneta kopetdaghensis Tanasevitch, 1989

Species of spider

Agyneta kopetdaghensis is a species of sheet weaver found in Iran and Turkmenistan. It was described by Tanasevitch in 1989.
