= Agyneta breviceps =

Scientific classification
- Domain: Eukaryota
- Kingdom: Animalia
- Phylum: Arthropoda
- Subphylum: Chelicerata
- Class: Arachnida
- Order: Araneae
- Infraorder: Araneomorphae
- Family: Linyphiidae
- Genus: Agyneta
- Species: A. breviceps

Binomial name
- Agyneta breviceps Hippa & Oksala, 1985

Species of spider

Agyneta breviceps is a species of sheet weaver found in Finland. It was described by Hippa & Oksala in 1985.
