= Agyneta pakistanica =

Scientific classification
- Kingdom: Animalia
- Phylum: Arthropoda
- Subphylum: Chelicerata
- Class: Arachnida
- Order: Araneae
- Infraorder: Araneomorphae
- Family: Linyphiidae
- Genus: Agyneta
- Species: A. pakistanica

Binomial name
- Agyneta pakistanica Tanasevitch, 2011

Species of spider

Agyneta pakistanica is a species of sheet weaver found in Pakistan. It was described by Tanasevitch in 2011.
