= Agyneta rugosa =

Scientific classification
- Domain: Eukaryota
- Kingdom: Animalia
- Phylum: Arthropoda
- Subphylum: Chelicerata
- Class: Arachnida
- Order: Araneae
- Infraorder: Araneomorphae
- Family: Linyphiidae
- Genus: Agyneta
- Species: A. rugosa

Binomial name
- Agyneta rugosa Wunderlich, 1992

Species of spider

Agyneta rugosa is a species of sheet weaver found in the Azores. It was described by Wunderlich in 1992.
