= Agyneta equestris =

Scientific classification
- Domain: Eukaryota
- Kingdom: Animalia
- Phylum: Arthropoda
- Subphylum: Chelicerata
- Class: Arachnida
- Order: Araneae
- Infraorder: Araneomorphae
- Family: Linyphiidae
- Genus: Agyneta
- Species: A. equestris

Binomial name
- Agyneta equestris (L. Koch, 1881)

Species of spider

Agyneta equestris is a species of sheet weaver found in Central Europe and Ukraine. It was described by L. Koch in 1881.
