= Agyneta levii =

Scientific classification
- Kingdom: Animalia
- Phylum: Arthropoda
- Subphylum: Chelicerata
- Class: Arachnida
- Order: Araneae
- Infraorder: Araneomorphae
- Family: Linyphiidae
- Genus: Agyneta
- Species: A. levii

Binomial name
- Agyneta levii Tanasevitch, 1989

Species of spider

Agyneta levii is a species of sheet weaver spider (family Linyphiidae) found in Russia. It was described by Tanasevitch in 1984.
