= Agyneta milleri =

Scientific classification
- Domain: Eukaryota
- Kingdom: Animalia
- Phylum: Arthropoda
- Subphylum: Chelicerata
- Class: Arachnida
- Order: Araneae
- Infraorder: Araneomorphae
- Family: Linyphiidae
- Genus: Agyneta
- Species: A. milleri

Binomial name
- Agyneta milleri (Thaler et al., 1997)

Species of spider

Agyneta milleri is a species of sheet weaver spider in the family Linyphiidae, and is found in the Czech Republic and Slovakia. It was described by Thaler et al. in 1997.
