= Agyneta evadens =

Scientific classification
- Domain: Eukaryota
- Kingdom: Animalia
- Phylum: Arthropoda
- Subphylum: Chelicerata
- Class: Arachnida
- Order: Araneae
- Infraorder: Araneomorphae
- Family: Linyphiidae
- Genus: Agyneta
- Species: A. evadens

Binomial name
- Agyneta evadens (Chamberlin, 1925)

Species of spider

Agyneta evadens is a species of sheet weaver found in Canada and the United States. It was described by Chamberlin in 1925.
