= Agyneta serrata =

Scientific classification
- Domain: Eukaryota
- Kingdom: Animalia
- Phylum: Arthropoda
- Subphylum: Chelicerata
- Class: Arachnida
- Order: Araneae
- Infraorder: Araneomorphae
- Family: Linyphiidae
- Genus: Agyneta
- Species: A. serrata

Binomial name
- Agyneta serrata (Emerton, 1909)

Species of spider

Agyneta serrata is a species of sheet weaver found in Canada and the United States. It was described by Emerton in 1909.
