= Agyneta transversa =

Scientific classification
- Domain: Eukaryota
- Kingdom: Animalia
- Phylum: Arthropoda
- Subphylum: Chelicerata
- Class: Arachnida
- Order: Araneae
- Infraorder: Araneomorphae
- Family: Linyphiidae
- Genus: Agyneta
- Species: A. transversa

Binomial name
- Agyneta transversa (Banks, 1898)

Species of spider

Agyneta transversa is a species of sheet weaver found in Mexico. It was described by Banks in 1898.
