= Agyneta serratichelis =

Scientific classification
- Kingdom: Animalia
- Phylum: Arthropoda
- Subphylum: Chelicerata
- Class: Arachnida
- Order: Araneae
- Infraorder: Araneomorphae
- Family: Linyphiidae
- Genus: Agyneta
- Species: A. serratichelis

Binomial name
- Agyneta serratichelis (Denis, 1964)

Species of spider

Agyneta serratichelis is a species of sheet weaver spider found in Sudan. It was described by Jacques Denis in 1964.
