= Agyneta angulata =

Scientific classification
- Domain: Eukaryota
- Kingdom: Animalia
- Phylum: Arthropoda
- Subphylum: Chelicerata
- Class: Arachnida
- Order: Araneae
- Infraorder: Araneomorphae
- Family: Linyphiidae
- Genus: Agyneta
- Species: A. angulata

Binomial name
- Agyneta angulata (Emerton, 1882)

Species of spider

Agyneta angulata is a species of sheet weaver found in the United States and Canada. It was described by Emerton in 1882.
