= Agyneta bronx =

Scientific classification
- Kingdom: Animalia
- Phylum: Arthropoda
- Subphylum: Chelicerata
- Class: Arachnida
- Order: Araneae
- Infraorder: Araneomorphae
- Family: Linyphiidae
- Genus: Agyneta
- Species: A. bronx

Binomial name
- Agyneta bronx Dupérré, 2013

Species of spider

Agyneta bronx is a species of sheet weaver found in the United States. It was described by Nadine Dupérré in 2013 based on specimens from Pennsylvania, Missouri, Nebraska, New York, and North Dakota. The species name bronx refers to The Bronx, New York, where the type specimen was collected in 1964.

Males can be distinguished from other Agyneta species by their large triangular-shaped dorsal cymbial tubercle and long, sinuous lamella characteristica (a sheet-like hardened part of the palpal bulb). Females can be distinguished by their diverging copulatory ducts visible on the proximal part of the scape of the epigyne.
