= Agyneta fabra =

Conservation status
- Secure (NatureServe)

Scientific classification
- Kingdom: Animalia
- Phylum: Arthropoda
- Subphylum: Chelicerata
- Class: Arachnida
- Order: Araneae
- Infraorder: Araneomorphae
- Family: Linyphiidae
- Genus: Agyneta
- Species: A. fabra

Binomial name
- Agyneta fabra (Keyserling, 1886)

Species of spider

Agyneta fabra is a species of sheet weaver found in Canada and the United States. It was described by Keyserling in 1886.
