= Agyneta uta =

Scientific classification
- Kingdom: Animalia
- Phylum: Arthropoda
- Subphylum: Chelicerata
- Class: Arachnida
- Order: Araneae
- Infraorder: Araneomorphae
- Family: Linyphiidae
- Genus: Agyneta
- Species: A. uta

Binomial name
- Agyneta uta (Chamberlin, 1920)

Species of spider

Agyneta uta is a species of sheet weaver found in the United States. It was described by Chamberlin in 1920.
