= Agyneta paraprosecta =

Scientific classification
- Kingdom: Animalia
- Phylum: Arthropoda
- Subphylum: Chelicerata
- Class: Arachnida
- Order: Araneae
- Infraorder: Araneomorphae
- Family: Linyphiidae
- Genus: Agyneta
- Species: A. paraprosecta

Binomial name
- Agyneta paraprosecta Tanasevitch, 2010

Species of spider

Agyneta paraprosecta is a species of sheet weaver found in the United Arab Emirates. It was described by Tanasevitch in 2010.
