= Agyneta martensi =

Scientific classification
- Kingdom: Animalia
- Phylum: Arthropoda
- Subphylum: Chelicerata
- Class: Arachnida
- Order: Araneae
- Infraorder: Araneomorphae
- Family: Linyphiidae
- Genus: Agyneta
- Species: A. martensi

Binomial name
- Agyneta martensi Tanasevitch, 2006

Species of spider

Agyneta martensi is a species of sheet weaver found in China. It was described by Tanasevitch in 2006.
