= Agyneta lila =

Scientific classification
- Kingdom: Animalia
- Phylum: Arthropoda
- Subphylum: Chelicerata
- Class: Arachnida
- Order: Araneae
- Infraorder: Araneomorphae
- Family: Linyphiidae
- Genus: Agyneta
- Species: A. lila

Binomial name
- Agyneta lila (Dönitz & Strand, 1906)

Species of spider

Agyneta lila is a species of spider in the family Linyphiidae (sheet weavers), found in Japan. It was described by Dönitz & Strand in 1906.
