= Agyneta ignorata =

Scientific classification
- Domain: Eukaryota
- Kingdom: Animalia
- Phylum: Arthropoda
- Subphylum: Chelicerata
- Class: Arachnida
- Order: Araneae
- Infraorder: Araneomorphae
- Family: Linyphiidae
- Genus: Agyneta
- Species: A. ignorata

Binomial name
- Agyneta ignorata (Saito, 1982)

Species of spider

Agyneta ignorata is a species of sheet weaver found in Japan. It was described by Saito in 1982.
