= Agyneta spicula =

Scientific classification
- Domain: Eukaryota
- Kingdom: Animalia
- Phylum: Arthropoda
- Subphylum: Chelicerata
- Class: Arachnida
- Order: Araneae
- Infraorder: Araneomorphae
- Family: Linyphiidae
- Genus: Agyneta
- Species: A. spicula

Binomial name
- Agyneta spicula Duperre, 2013

Species of spider

Agyneta spicula is a species of sheet weaver found in the United States. It was described by Duperre in 2013.
