= Agyneta albomaculata =

Scientific classification
- Domain: Eukaryota
- Kingdom: Animalia
- Phylum: Arthropoda
- Subphylum: Chelicerata
- Class: Arachnida
- Order: Araneae
- Infraorder: Araneomorphae
- Family: Linyphiidae
- Genus: Agyneta
- Species: A. albomaculata

Binomial name
- Agyneta albomaculata (Baert, 1990)

Species of spider

Agyneta albomaculata is a species of sheet weaver found in the Galapagos Islands. It was described by Baert in 1990.
