= Agyneta unimaculata =

Scientific classification
- Domain: Eukaryota
- Kingdom: Animalia
- Phylum: Arthropoda
- Subphylum: Chelicerata
- Class: Arachnida
- Order: Araneae
- Infraorder: Araneomorphae
- Family: Linyphiidae
- Genus: Agyneta
- Species: A. unimaculata

Binomial name
- Agyneta unimaculata (Banks, 1892)

Species of spider

Agyneta unimaculata is a species of sheet weaver found in Canada and the United States. It was described by Banks in 1892.
