= Agyneta insulana =

Scientific classification
- Kingdom: Animalia
- Phylum: Arthropoda
- Subphylum: Chelicerata
- Class: Arachnida
- Order: Araneae
- Infraorder: Araneomorphae
- Family: Linyphiidae
- Genus: Agyneta
- Species: A. insulana

Binomial name
- Agyneta insulana Tanasevitch, 2000

Species of spider

Agyneta insulana is a species of sheet weaver found in Sakhalin and the Kuril Islands. It was described by Tanasevitch in 2000.
