= Agyneta gulosa =

Scientific classification
- Domain: Eukaryota
- Kingdom: Animalia
- Phylum: Arthropoda
- Subphylum: Chelicerata
- Class: Arachnida
- Order: Araneae
- Infraorder: Araneomorphae
- Family: Linyphiidae
- Genus: Agyneta
- Species: A. gulosa

Binomial name
- Agyneta gulosa (L. Koch, 1896)

Species of spider

Agyneta gulosa is a species of sheet weaver found in the Palearctic. It was described by L. Koch in 1896.
