= Agyneta metropolis =

Scientific classification
- Kingdom: Animalia
- Phylum: Arthropoda
- Subphylum: Chelicerata
- Class: Arachnida
- Order: Araneae
- Infraorder: Araneomorphae
- Family: Linyphiidae
- Genus: Agyneta
- Species: A. metropolis

Binomial name
- Agyneta metropolis (Russell-Smith & Jocqué, 1986)

Species of spider

Agyneta metropolis is a species of sheet weaver found in Kenya. It was described by Russell-Smith & Jocqué in 1986.
