= Agyneta olivacea =

Conservation status
- Secure (NatureServe)

Scientific classification
- Kingdom: Animalia
- Phylum: Arthropoda
- Subphylum: Chelicerata
- Class: Arachnida
- Order: Araneae
- Infraorder: Araneomorphae
- Family: Linyphiidae
- Genus: Agyneta
- Species: A. olivacea

Binomial name
- Agyneta olivacea (Emerton, 1882)

Species of spider

Agyneta olivacea is a species of sheet weaver found in the Holarctic. It was described by James Henry Emerton in 1882.
