= Agyneta kaszabi =

Scientific classification
- Kingdom: Animalia
- Phylum: Arthropoda
- Subphylum: Chelicerata
- Class: Arachnida
- Order: Araneae
- Infraorder: Araneomorphae
- Family: Linyphiidae
- Genus: Agyneta
- Species: A. kaszabi

Binomial name
- Agyneta kaszabi (Loksa, 1965)

Species of spider

Agyneta kaszabi is a species of sheet weavers found in Kazakhstan, Mongolia and Russia. It was described by Loksa in 1965.
