= Agyneta orites =

Scientific classification
- Kingdom: Animalia
- Phylum: Arthropoda
- Subphylum: Chelicerata
- Class: Arachnida
- Order: Araneae
- Infraorder: Araneomorphae
- Family: Linyphiidae
- Genus: Agyneta
- Species: A. orites

Binomial name
- Agyneta orites (Thorell, 1875)

Species of spider

Agyneta orites is a species of sheet weaver found in Central Europe. It was described by Thorell in 1875.
