= Agyneta birulaioides =

Scientific classification
- Domain: Eukaryota
- Kingdom: Animalia
- Phylum: Arthropoda
- Subphylum: Chelicerata
- Class: Arachnida
- Order: Araneae
- Infraorder: Araneomorphae
- Family: Linyphiidae
- Genus: Agyneta
- Species: A. birulaioides

Binomial name
- Agyneta birulaioides Wunderlich, 2005

Species of spider

Agyneta birulaioides is a species of sheet weaver found in Ukraine, Kazakhstan, Russia and Mongolia. It was described by Wunderlich in 2005.
