= Agyneta ressli =

Scientific classification
- Domain: Eukaryota
- Kingdom: Animalia
- Phylum: Arthropoda
- Subphylum: Chelicerata
- Class: Arachnida
- Order: Araneae
- Infraorder: Araneomorphae
- Family: Linyphiidae
- Genus: Agyneta
- Species: A. ressli

Binomial name
- Agyneta ressli (Wunderlich, 1973)

Species of spider

Agyneta ressli is a species of sheet weaver found in Austria, Germany, Greece and Switzerland. It was described by Wunderlich in 1973.
