= Agyneta bermudensis =

Scientific classification
- Kingdom: Animalia
- Phylum: Arthropoda
- Subphylum: Chelicerata
- Class: Arachnida
- Order: Araneae
- Infraorder: Araneomorphae
- Family: Linyphiidae
- Genus: Agyneta
- Species: A. bermudensis

Binomial name
- Agyneta bermudensis (Strand, 1906)

Species of spider

Agyneta bermudensis is a species of sheet weaver found in Bermuda. It was described by Strand in 1906.
