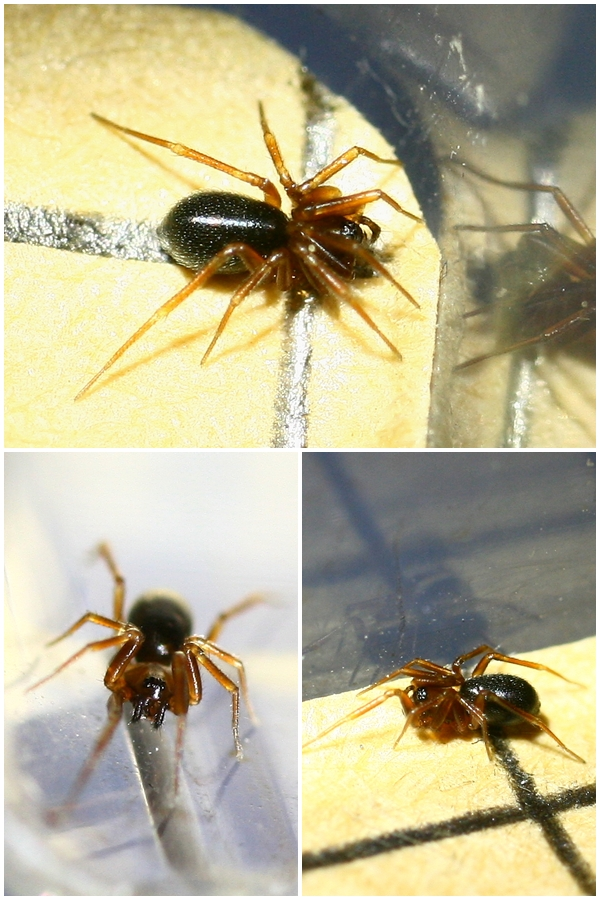

Scientific classification
- Domain: Eukaryota
- Kingdom: Animalia
- Phylum: Arthropoda
- Subphylum: Chelicerata
- Class: Arachnida
- Order: Araneae
- Infraorder: Araneomorphae
- Family: Linyphiidae
- Genus: Agyneta
- Species: A. conigera

Binomial name
- Agyneta conigera (O.P.-Cambridge, 1863)

= Agyneta conigera =

Species of spider

Agyneta conigera is a species of sheet weaver found in the Palearctic and Congo. It was described by O.P.-Cambridge in 1863.
