= Agyneta dactylis =

Scientific classification
- Domain: Eukaryota
- Kingdom: Animalia
- Phylum: Arthropoda
- Subphylum: Chelicerata
- Class: Arachnida
- Order: Araneae
- Infraorder: Araneomorphae
- Family: Linyphiidae
- Genus: Agyneta
- Species: A. dactylis

Binomial name
- Agyneta dactylis (Tao, Li & Zhu, 1995)

Species of spider

Agyneta dactylis is a species of sheet weaver found in China. It was described by Tao, Li & Zhu in 1995.
