= Agyneta similis =

Scientific classification
- Domain: Eukaryota
- Kingdom: Animalia
- Phylum: Arthropoda
- Subphylum: Chelicerata
- Class: Arachnida
- Order: Araneae
- Infraorder: Araneomorphae
- Family: Linyphiidae
- Genus: Agyneta
- Species: A. similis

Binomial name
- Agyneta similis (Kulczynski, 1926)

Species of spider

Agyneta similis is a species of sheet weaver found in Finland, Iceland, Kazakhstan and Russia. It was described by Kulczynski in 1926.
