= Agyneta montivaga =

Scientific classification
- Domain: Eukaryota
- Kingdom: Animalia
- Phylum: Arthropoda
- Subphylum: Chelicerata
- Class: Arachnida
- Order: Araneae
- Infraorder: Araneomorphae
- Family: Linyphiidae
- Genus: Agyneta
- Species: A. montivaga

Binomial name
- Agyneta montivaga (Millidge, 1991)

Species of spider

Agyneta montivaga is a species of sheet weaver found in Venezuela. It was described by Millidge in 1991.
