= Agyneta gracilipes =

Scientific classification
- Kingdom: Animalia
- Phylum: Arthropoda
- Subphylum: Chelicerata
- Class: Arachnida
- Order: Araneae
- Infraorder: Araneomorphae
- Family: Linyphiidae
- Genus: Agyneta
- Species: A. gracilipes

Binomial name
- Agyneta gracilipes (Holm, 1968)

Species of spider

Agyneta gracilipes is a species of sheet weaver found in Cameroon, Gabon, DR Congo, Kenya and Angola. It was described by Holm in 1968.
