= Agyneta jiriensis =

Scientific classification
- Domain: Eukaryota
- Kingdom: Animalia
- Phylum: Arthropoda
- Subphylum: Chelicerata
- Class: Arachnida
- Order: Araneae
- Infraorder: Araneomorphae
- Family: Linyphiidae
- Genus: Agyneta
- Species: A. jiriensis

Binomial name
- Agyneta jiriensis Wunderlich, 1983

Species of spider

Agyneta jiriensis is a species of sheet weaver found in Nepal. It was described by Wunderlich in 1983.
