= Agyneta pseudorurestris =

Scientific classification
- Domain: Eukaryota
- Kingdom: Animalia
- Phylum: Arthropoda
- Subphylum: Chelicerata
- Class: Arachnida
- Order: Araneae
- Infraorder: Araneomorphae
- Family: Linyphiidae
- Genus: Agyneta
- Species: A. pseudorurestris

Binomial name
- Agyneta pseudorurestris Wunderlich, 1980

Species of spider

Agyneta pseudorurestris is a species of sheet weaver found in Portugal, Spain, Cyprus, Sardinia, Algeria, Tunisia and Israel. It was described by Wunderlich in 1980.
