= Agyneta rurestris =

Scientific classification
- Kingdom: Animalia
- Phylum: Arthropoda
- Subphylum: Chelicerata
- Class: Arachnida
- Order: Araneae
- Infraorder: Araneomorphae
- Family: Linyphiidae
- Genus: Agyneta
- Species: A. rurestris

Binomial name
- Agyneta rurestris (C. L. Koch, 1836)

Species of spider

Agyneta rurestris is a species of sheet weaver found in the Palearctic. It was described by C. L. Koch in 1836.
