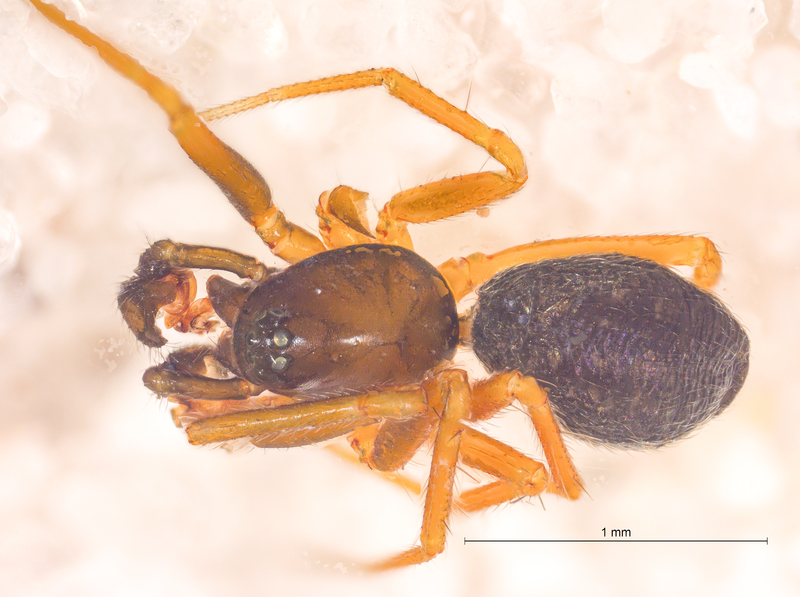
- Male specimen

Scientific classification
- Kingdom: Animalia
- Phylum: Arthropoda
- Subphylum: Chelicerata
- Class: Arachnida
- Order: Araneae
- Infraorder: Araneomorphae
- Family: Linyphiidae
- Genus: Agyneta
- Species: A. affinis

Binomial name
- Agyneta affinis (Kulczyński, 1898)

Synonyms
- Agyneta beata (O. Pickard-Cambridge, 1907); Aprolagus beatus (O. Pickard-Cambridge, 1907); Bathyphantes explicata O. Pickard-Cambridge, 1911; Meioneta affinis (Kulczyński, 1898); Meioneta beata (O. Pickard-Cambridge, 1907); Microneta beata O. Pickard-Cambridge, 1907; Micryphantes beatus (O. Pickard-Cambridge, 1907); Sintula affinis Kulczyński, 1898

= Agyneta affinis =

Species of spider

Agyneta affinis is a species of sheet weaver found in the Palearctic. It was described by Władysław Kulczyński in 1898 as Sintula affinis. It is found throughout Europe, from Spain across to Russia and the Chinese province of Xinjiang. It prefers open habitats such as grasslands, raised bogs, fens, and wet meadows where it constructs a web in the lower part of the vegetation.

== Taxonomy ==
Agyneta affinis was first described by Władysław Kulczyński in 1898 as Sintula affinis, from females collected in Austria near Vienna and Laxenberg. In 1907, Octavius Pickard-Cambridge independently described the species under the name Microneta beata from British specimens collected in Leeds, Hexham, and Epping Forest. Pickard-Cambridge separately described the species again in 1911 as Bathyphantes explicata from a male individual collected in the Kew Gardens. One year later in 1912, British physician and arachnologist Arthur Randall Jackson transferred Pickard-Cambridge's Microneta beata to the genus Micryphantes (spelled as Micryphantes beatus).

In 1915, Kulczyński suggested that Micryphantes beatus could be a synonym of Sintula affinis. However, he declined to declare a formal synonymy since he had only seen male Micryphantes beatus and female Sintula affinis. No further taxonomic acts occurred until 1929, when Eugene Simon briefly mentioned Microneta beata belonging to the now-defunct genus Aprolagus in a footnote. In 1939, William Syer Bristowe synonymized the names Microneta beata and Bathyphantes explicata under the new name Meioneta beata, without reference to Simon's Aprolagus beatus or Jackson's Micryphantes beatus. From 1939 to 1973, the names Sintula affinis, Aprolagus beatus, and Meioneta beata appeared in arachnological publications without synonimization.

In 1973, Jörg Wunderlich synonymized Pickard-Cambridge's Microneta beata (and therefore its other combinations, Aprolagus beatus and Meioneta beata) with Kulczyński's Sintula affinis. However, he transferred the genus of the species to Meioneta, forming the new combination Meioneta affinis. This synonymy was not widely accepted at the time, and arachnological publications continued to use Aprolagus beatus and Meioneta beata as valid names. The species first appeared placed within the genus Agyneta in Andrei Tanasevitch's 1987 work on the spider fauna of the Caucasus as Agyneta beata, a change which he did not explain. In 2013, Nadine Dupérré transferred Meioneta affinis to the genus Agyneta in her revision of the genus.

== Description ==
Agyneta affinis has a brown cephalothorax, with darker margins. The sternum is brown and tinged with black. The chelicerae and legs are yellow-brown. The abdomen ranges in color from brown to completely black. Both sexes are approximately the same size, ranging from 1.5 to 2.0 mm in length. The male palp displays a very broad, distally concave lamella characteristica, and the female epigyne displays a quadrangular scape.
