= Agyneta llanoensis =

Scientific classification
- Domain: Eukaryota
- Kingdom: Animalia
- Phylum: Arthropoda
- Subphylum: Chelicerata
- Class: Arachnida
- Order: Araneae
- Infraorder: Araneomorphae
- Family: Linyphiidae
- Genus: Agyneta
- Species: A. llanoensis

Binomial name
- Agyneta llanoensis (Gertsch & Davis, 1936)

Species of spider

Agyneta llanoensis is a species of sheet weaver found in the United States. It was described by Gertsch & Davis in 1936.
