= Agyneta canariensis =

Scientific classification
- Domain: Eukaryota
- Kingdom: Animalia
- Phylum: Arthropoda
- Subphylum: Chelicerata
- Class: Arachnida
- Order: Araneae
- Infraorder: Araneomorphae
- Family: Linyphiidae
- Genus: Agyneta
- Species: A. canariensis

Binomial name
- Agyneta canariensis Wunderlich, 1987

Species of spider

Agyneta canariensis is a species of sheet weaver found in the Canary Islands. It was described by Wunderlich in 1987.
