= Agyneta exigua =

Scientific classification
- Kingdom: Animalia
- Phylum: Arthropoda
- Subphylum: Chelicerata
- Class: Arachnida
- Order: Araneae
- Infraorder: Araneomorphae
- Family: Linyphiidae
- Genus: Agyneta
- Species: A. exigua

Binomial name
- Agyneta exigua (Russell-Smith, 1992)

Species of spider

Agyneta exigua is a species of sheet weaver found in Cameroon and Nigeria. It was described by Russell-Smith in 1992.
