= Agyneta tibialis =

Scientific classification
- Kingdom: Animalia
- Phylum: Arthropoda
- Subphylum: Chelicerata
- Class: Arachnida
- Order: Araneae
- Infraorder: Araneomorphae
- Family: Linyphiidae
- Genus: Agyneta
- Species: A. tibialis

Binomial name
- Agyneta tibialis Tanasevitch, 2005

Species of spider

Agyneta tibialis is a species of sheet weaver found in Russia. It was described by Tanasevitch in 2005.
