= Agyneta arietans =

Scientific classification
- Kingdom: Animalia
- Phylum: Arthropoda
- Subphylum: Chelicerata
- Class: Arachnida
- Order: Araneae
- Infraorder: Araneomorphae
- Family: Linyphiidae
- Genus: Agyneta
- Species: A. arietans

Binomial name
- Agyneta arietans (O.P.-Cambridge, 1872)

Species of spider

Agyneta arietans is a species of sheet weaver found in Germany and Poland. It was described by O.P.-Cambridge in 1872.
