= Agyneta obscura =

Scientific classification
- Kingdom: Animalia
- Phylum: Arthropoda
- Subphylum: Chelicerata
- Class: Arachnida
- Order: Araneae
- Infraorder: Araneomorphae
- Family: Linyphiidae
- Genus: Agyneta
- Species: A. obscura

Binomial name
- Agyneta obscura (Denis, 1950)

Species of spider

Agyneta obscura is a species of sheet weaver found in Congo and Tanzania. It was described by Jacques Denis in 1950.
