= Agyneta gagnei =

Conservation status
- Critically Imperiled (NatureServe)

Scientific classification
- Kingdom: Animalia
- Phylum: Arthropoda
- Subphylum: Chelicerata
- Class: Arachnida
- Order: Araneae
- Infraorder: Araneomorphae
- Family: Linyphiidae
- Genus: Agyneta
- Species: A. gagnei

Binomial name
- Agyneta gagnei (Gertsch, 1973)

Species of spider

Agyneta gagnei is a species of sheet weaver found in Hawaii. It was described by Gertsch in 1973.
