= Agyneta fillmorana =

Scientific classification
- Kingdom: Animalia
- Phylum: Arthropoda
- Subphylum: Chelicerata
- Class: Arachnida
- Order: Araneae
- Infraorder: Araneomorphae
- Family: Linyphiidae
- Genus: Agyneta
- Species: A. fillmorana

Binomial name
- Agyneta fillmorana (Chamberlin, 1919)

Species of spider

Agyneta fillmorana is a species of sheet weaver found in Canada and the United States. It was described by Chamberlin in 1919.
