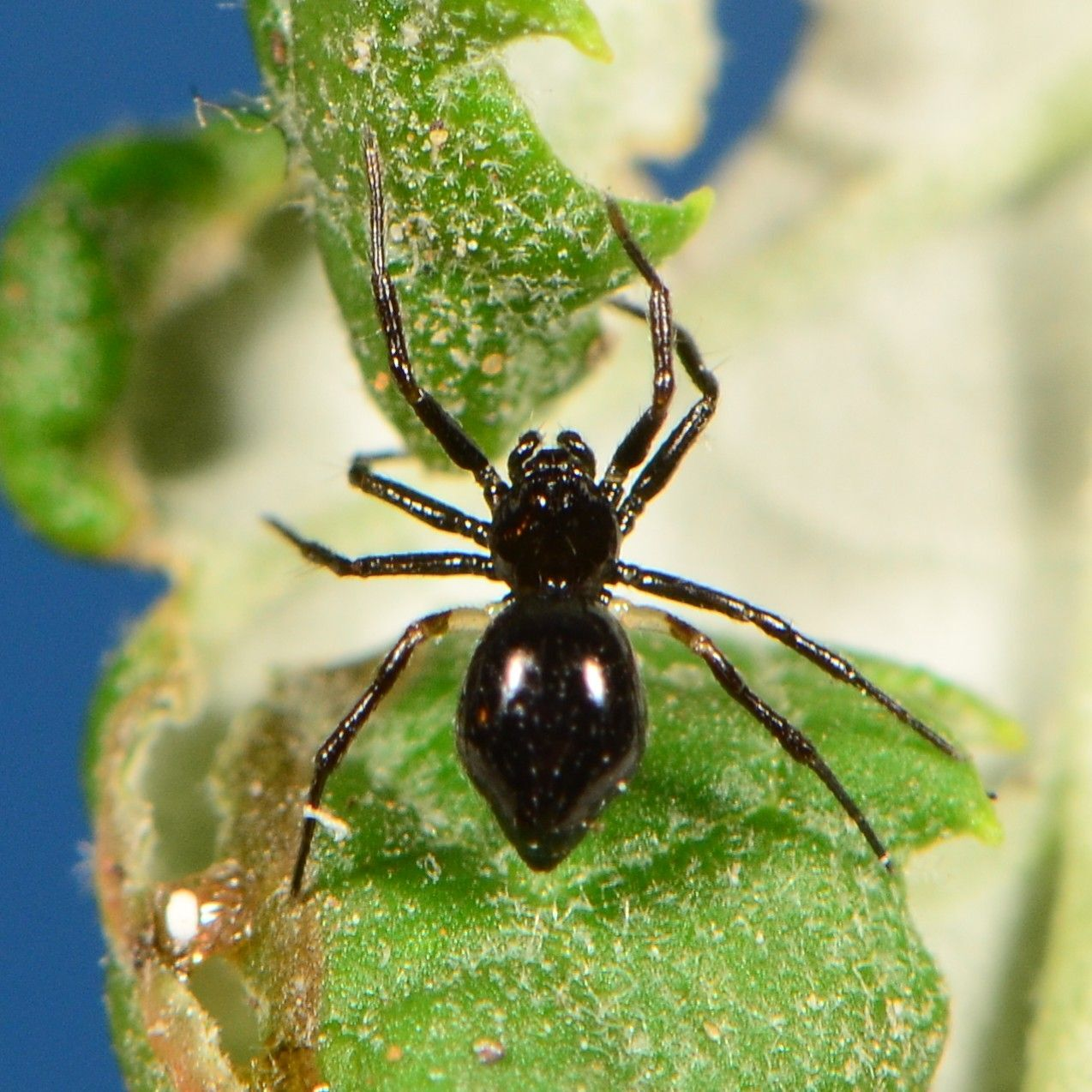
- female A. habra
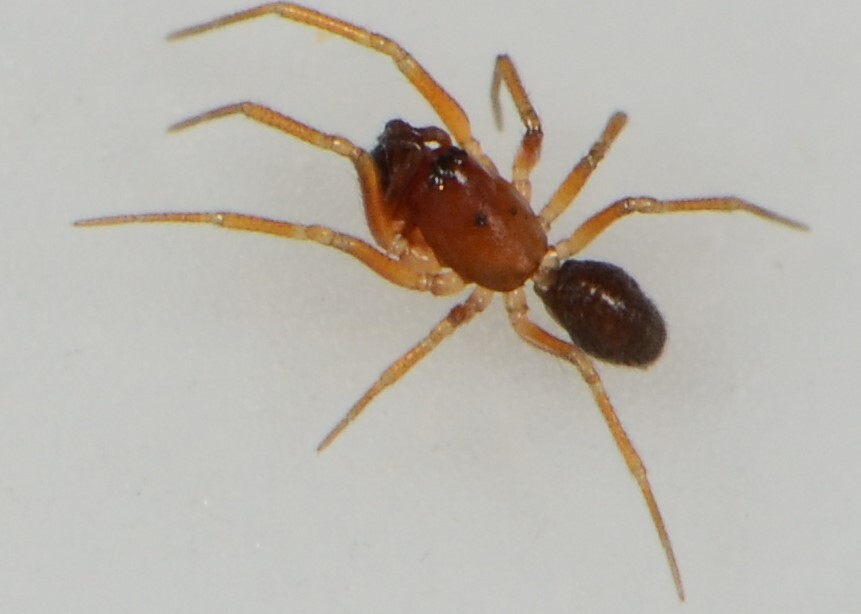
- male A. natalensis

Scientific classification
- Kingdom: Animalia
- Phylum: Arthropoda
- Subphylum: Chelicerata
- Class: Arachnida
- Order: Araneae
- Infraorder: Araneomorphae
- Family: Linyphiidae
- Genus: Agyneta; Hull, 1911

Type species
- A. decora (O. Pickard-Cambridge, 1871)

Species
- 203, see text

Synonyms
- Aprolagus Simon, 1929; Eupolis O. Pickard-Cambridge, 1900; Gnathantes Chamberlin & Ivie, 1943; Meioneta Hull, 1920; Syedrula Simon, 1929

= Agyneta =

Genus of spiders

Agyneta is a genus of dwarf spiders (family Linyphiidae) that was first described by J. E. Hull in 1911.

== Species ==
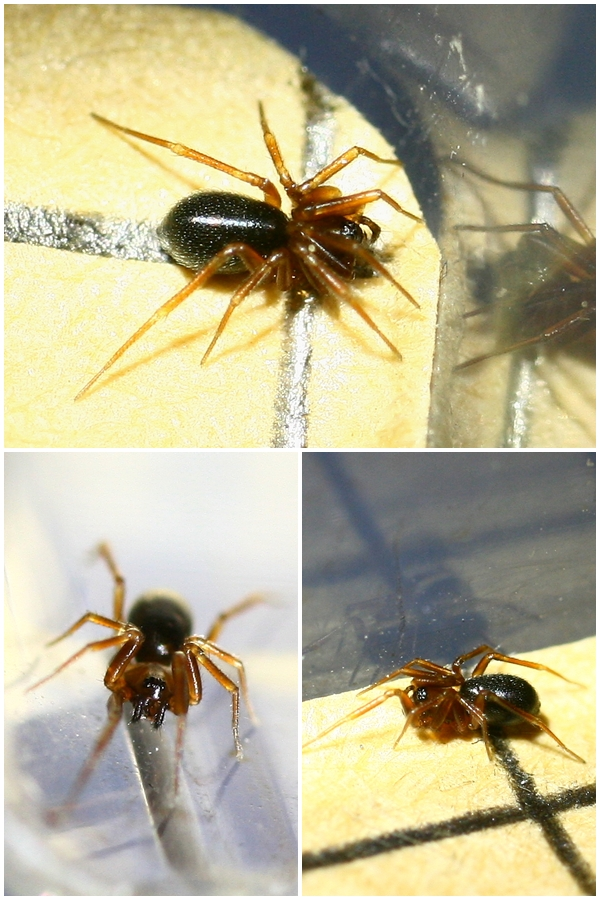
A. conigera

As of October 2025, this genus includes 203 species and one subspecies:

- Agyneta adami (Millidge, 1991) – Brazil
- Agyneta affinis (Kulczyński, 1898) – Europe, Russia (Europe to Far East), China
- Agyneta affinisoides Tanasevitch, 1984 – Russia (Middle Siberia to Far East)
- Agyneta albinotata (Millidge, 1991) – Colombia
- Agyneta alboguttata (Jocqué, 1985) – Comoros
- Agyneta albomaculata (Baert, 1990) – Galapagos
- Agyneta allosubtilis Loksa, 1965 – North America, Russia (Europe to Far East), Mongolia
- Agyneta alpica Tanasevitch, 2000 – France, Switzerland, Austria
- Agyneta amersaxatilis Saaristo & Koponen, 1998 – Russia (north-eastern Siberia), Canada, United States
- Agyneta angulata (Emerton, 1882) – Canada, United States
- Agyneta aquila Dupérré, 2013 – Canada
- Agyneta arida (Baert, 1990) – Galapagos
- Agyneta arietans (O. Pickard-Cambridge, 1873) – Germany, Poland
- Agyneta atra (Millidge, 1991) – Venezuela
- Agyneta baltoroi (Caporiacco, 1935) – Pakistan
- Agyneta barfoot Dupérré, 2013 – United States
- Agyneta barrowsi (Chamberlin & Ivie, 1944) – Canada, United States
- Agyneta bermudensis (Strand, 1906) – Bermuda
- Agyneta birulai (Kulczyński, 1908) – Russia (Urals to Far East), China, Canada
- Agyneta birulaioides Wunderlich, 1995 – Ukraine, Kazakhstan, Russia (South Siberia), Mongolia
- Agyneta boninensis (Saito, 1982) – Japan
- Agyneta breviceps Hippa & Oksala, 1985 – Finland
- Agyneta brevipes (Keyserling, 1886) – Alaska, United States
- Agyneta brevis (Millidge, 1991) – Peru
- Agyneta bronx Dupérré, 2013 – United States
- Agyneta brusnewi (Kulczyński, 1908) – Russia (Urals to Far East)
- Agyneta bucklei Dupérré, 2013 – Canada, United States
- Agyneta bueko Wunderlich, 1983 – Nepal
- Agyneta bulavintsevi Tanasevitch, 2016 – Russia (Europe, north-eastern Siberia)
- Agyneta canariensis Wunderlich, 1987 – Canary Islands, Savage Is. Madeira
- Agyneta castanea (Millidge, 1991) – Chile
- Agyneta catalina Dupérré, 2013 – United States
- Agyneta cauta (O. Pickard-Cambridge, 1903) – Europe, Russia (Europe to South Siberia), Kyrgyzstan
- Agyneta chiricahua Dupérré, 2013 – United States
- Agyneta cincta (Millidge, 1991) – Colombia
- Agyneta collina (Millidge, 1991) – Colombia
- Agyneta conigera (O. Pickard-Cambridge, 1863) – Europe, Caucasus, Russia (Europe to Far East), Kazakhstan, Iran
- Agyneta crawfordi Dupérré, 2013 – United States
- Agyneta crista Dupérré, 2013 – United States
- Agyneta cuneata Tanasevitch, 2014 – Russia (Far East)
- Agyneta curvata (Bosmans, 1979) – Kenya
- Agyneta dactylis (Tao, Li & Zhu, 1995) – China
- Agyneta danielbelangeri Dupérré, 2013 – Canada, United States
- Agyneta darrelli Dupérré, 2013 – Canada, United States
- Agyneta decora (O. Pickard-Cambridge, 1871) – Alaska, Canada, Europe, Russia (Europe to Middle Siberia) (type species)
- Agyneta decorata (Chamberlin & Ivie, 1944) – United States
- Agyneta decurvis (Tao, Li & Zhu, 1995) – China
- Agyneta delphina Dupérré, 2013 – United States
- Agyneta dentifera (Locket, 1968) – Nigeria, Angola
- Agyneta depigmentata Wunderlich, 2008 – Azores
- Agyneta discolor (Millidge, 1991) – Colombia
- Agyneta disjuncta (Millidge, 1991) – Colombia
- Agyneta dynica Saaristo & Koponen, 1998 – Canada, United States
- Agyneta emertoni (Roewer, 1942) – Canada
- Agyneta equestris (L. Koch, 1881) – Europe
- Agyneta erinacea Dupérré, 2013 – United States
- Agyneta evadens (Chamberlin, 1925) – Canada, United States
- Agyneta exigua (Russell-Smith, 1992) – Cameroon, Nigeria
- Agyneta fabra (Keyserling, 1886) – Canada, United States
- Agyneta falcata (Li & Zhu, 1995) – China
- Agyneta fillmorana (Chamberlin, 1919) – Canada, United States
- Agyneta flandroyae (Jocqué, 1985) – Comoros
- Agyneta flavipes (Ono, 1991) – Japan
- Agyneta flax Dupérré, 2013 – United States
- Agyneta flibuscrocus Dupérré, 2013 – United States
- Agyneta floridana (Banks, 1896) – United States
- Agyneta fratrella (Chamberlin, 1919) – United States
- Agyneta frigida (Millidge, 1991) – Colombia
- Agyneta furcula Seo, 2018 – Korea
- Agyneta fusca (Millidge, 1991) – Peru
- Agyneta fuscipalpus (C. L. Koch, 1836) – Cape Verde, Azores, North Africa, Europe, Turkey, Caucasus, Russia (Europe to South Siberia), Iran, Kazakhstan, Central Asia
- Agyneta gagnei (Gertsch, 1973) – Hawaii
- Agyneta galapagosensis (Baert, 1990) – Galapagos, Brazil (Fernando de Noronha Is.), Uruguay
- Agyneta girardi Dupérré, 2013 – Canada, United States
- Agyneta glacialis (Caporiacco, 1935) – Pakistan (Karakorum)
- Agyneta gracilipes (Holm, 1968) – Cameroon, Gabon, DR Congo, Kenya, Angola
- Agyneta grandcanyon Dupérré, 2013 – United States
- Agyneta gulosa (L. Koch, 1869) – Europe, Russia (Europe to East Siberia), Japan
- Agyneta habra (Locket, 1968) – Nigeria, Kenya, Angola
- Agyneta hedini Paquin & Dupérré, 2009 – United States
- Agyneta himalaya Tanasevitch, 2018 – Nepal
- Agyneta hum Cajade, Rodrigues & Simó, 2023 – Brazil, Uruguay
- Agyneta ignorata (Saito, 1982) – Japan (Ogasawara Is.), China (Hainan)
- Agyneta inermis Tanasevitch, 2019 – France, Italy, Greece
- Agyneta innotabilis (O. Pickard-Cambridge, 1863) – Europe
- Agyneta insolita (Locket & Russell-Smith, 1980) – Nigeria
- Agyneta insulana Tanasevitch, 2000 – Russia (Sakhalin, Kurile Is.), Korea
- Agyneta iranica Tanasevitch, 2011 – Iran, Turkmenistan
- Agyneta issaqueena Dupérré, 2013 – United States
- Agyneta jacksoni (Brændegaard, 1937) – Canada, United States, Greenland
- Agyneta jiriensis Wunderlich, 1983 – Nepal
- Agyneta kashmirica (Caporiacco, 1935) – India (Kashmir)
- Agyneta kaszabi (Loksa, 1965) – Kazakhstan, Russia (South Siberia), Mongolia
- Agyneta kopetdaghensis Tanasevitch, 1989 – Iran, Turkmenistan, Kazakhstan
- Agyneta laimonasi Tanasevitch, 2006 – Russia (Far East)
- Agyneta larva (Locket, 1968) – Angola
- Agyneta lauta (Millidge, 1991) – Peru
- Agyneta ledfordi Dupérré, 2013 – United States
- Agyneta leucophora (Chamberlin & Ivie, 1944) – United States
- Agyneta levii Tanasevitch, 1984 – Russia (West to South Siberia)
- Agyneta levis (Locket, 1968) – Angola
- Agyneta lila (Dönitz & Strand, 1906) – Japan
- Agyneta llanoensis (Gertsch & Davis, 1936) – United States
- Agyneta longipes (Chamberlin & Ivie, 1944) – United States
- Agyneta lophophor (Chamberlin & Ivie, 1933) – Alaska, Canada, United States
- Agyneta luctuosa (Millidge, 1991) – Venezuela
- Agyneta manni (Crawford & Edwards, 1989) – United States
- Agyneta maritima (Emerton, 1919) – Russia (Middle Siberia to Far East), Mongolia, Alaska, Canada
- Agyneta martensi Tanasevitch, 2006 – China
- Agyneta mediocris (Millidge, 1991) – Colombia
- Agyneta mendosa (Millidge, 1991) – Colombia
- Agyneta merretti (Locket, 1968) – Angola
- Agyneta mesasiatica Tanasevitch, 2000 – France (Corsica), Italy, Russia (Caucasus), Azerbaijan, Iran, Central Asia
- Agyneta metatarsialis Tanasevitch, 2014 – Russia (South Siberia)
- Agyneta metropolis (Russell-Smith & Jocqué, 1986) – Kenya
- Agyneta micaria (Emerton, 1882) – Canada, United States
- Agyneta milleri (Thaler, Buchar & Kůrka, 1997) – Czech Republic, Slovakia
- Agyneta miniata Dupérré, 2013 – United States
- Agyneta minorata (Chamberlin & Ivie, 1944) – United States
- Agyneta mollis (O. Pickard-Cambridge, 1871) – Alaska, Canada, Europe, Morocco, Caucasus, Russia (Europe to Far East), Iran, China, Japan
- Agyneta mongolica (Loksa, 1965) – Mongolia, Russia (Far East)
- Agyneta montana (Millidge, 1991) – Ecuador
- Agyneta montivaga (Millidge, 1991) – Venezuela
- Agyneta mossica (Schikora, 1993) – Europe (without southern), Russia (Europe to West Siberia)
- Agyneta natalensis (Jocqué, 1984) – South Africa
- Agyneta nigra (Oi, 1960) – Russia (Middle Siberia to Far East), Mongolia, China, Korea, Japan
- Agyneta nigripes (Simon, 1884) – Canada, Greenland, Europe, Russia (Europe to Far East), Pakistan
  - A. n. nivicola (Simon, 1929) – France
- Agyneta obscura (Denis, 1950) – Congo, Tanzania
- Agyneta oculata (Millidge, 1991) – Peru
- Agyneta okefenokee Dupérré, 2013 – United States
- Agyneta olivacea (Emerton, 1882) – North America, Europe, Russia (Europe to Far East), Mongolia
- Agyneta opaca (Millidge, 1991) – Colombia
- Agyneta ordinaria (Chamberlin & Ivie, 1947) – Alaska, Canada, United States
- Agyneta orites (Thorell, 1875) – Spain, Alps (France, Italy, Switzerland, Germany, Austria, Slovenia)
- Agyneta pakistanica Tanasevitch, 2011 – Pakistan, Nepal
- Agyneta palgongsanensis (Paik, 1991) – Russia (Far East), China, Korea
- Agyneta palustris (Li & Zhu, 1995) – China
- Agyneta panthera Dupérré, 2013 – United States
- Agyneta paquini Dupérré, 2013 – United States
- Agyneta paraprosecta Tanasevitch, 2010 – United Arab Emirates
- Agyneta parva (Banks, 1896) – United States
- Agyneta perspicua Dupérré, 2013 – Canada, United States
- Agyneta picta (Chamberlin & Ivie, 1944) – United States
- Agyneta pinicola Gnelitsa, 2014 – Ukraine
- Agyneta pinta (Baert, 1990) – Galapagos
- Agyneta pistrix Dupérré, 2013 – United States
- Agyneta plagiata (Banks, 1929) – Panama
- Agyneta platnicki Dupérré, 2013 – United States
- Agyneta pogonophora (Locket, 1968) – Angola, Seychelles
- Agyneta prima (Millidge, 1991) – Colombia
- Agyneta propinqua (Millidge, 1991) – Peru, Brazil
- Agyneta propria (Millidge, 1991) – Ecuador
- Agyneta prosectes (Locket, 1968) – St. Helena, Nigeria, Ethiopia, Kenya, Angola
- Agyneta prosectoides (Locket & Russell-Smith, 1980) – Cameroon, Nigeria
- Agyneta protrudens (Chamberlin & Ivie, 1933) – Canada, United States
- Agyneta provincialis (Denis, 1949) – France
- Agyneta proxima (Millidge, 1991) – Colombia
- Agyneta pseudofuscipalpis Wunderlich, 1983 – Nepal
- Agyneta pseudorurestris Wunderlich, 1980 – Mediterranean
- Agyneta pseudosaxatilis Tanasevitch, 1984 – Russia (West Siberia to Far East), Kazakhstan
- Agyneta punctata Wunderlich, 1995 – Bulgaria, Greece, Turkey
- Agyneta ramosa Jackson, 1912 – Europe, Caucasus, Russia (Europe to South Siberia)
- Agyneta regina (Chamberlin & Ivie, 1944) – United States
- Agyneta ressli (Wunderlich, 1973) – Alps (Germany, Switzerland, Austria, Italy), North Macedonia, Greece
- Agyneta ripariensis Tanasevitch, 1984 – Russia (Europe to Far East)
- Agyneta rugosa Wunderlich, 1992 – Azores
- Agyneta rurestris (C. L. Koch, 1836) – Europe, Egypt, Turkey, Caucasus, Russia (Europe to South Siberia), Iran, Central Asia, China, Korea
- Agyneta saaristoi Tanasevitch, 2000 – Ukraine, Russia (Europe, Caucasus, South Siberia), Kazakhstan
- Agyneta sandia Dupérré, 2013 – United States
- Agyneta saxatilis (Blackwall, 1844) – Europe
- Agyneta semipallida (Chamberlin & Ivie, 1944) – United States
- Agyneta serrata (Emerton, 1909) – Canada, United States
- Agyneta serratichelis (Denis, 1964) – Sudan
- Agyneta serratula Wunderlich, 1995 – Mongolia
- Agyneta sheffordiana Dupérré & Paquin, 2007 – Canada
- Agyneta silvae (Millidge, 1991) – Peru
- Agyneta similis (Kulczyński, 1926) – Iceland, Finland, Russia (Europe to Far East), Kazakhstan
- Agyneta simplex (Emerton, 1926) – Alaska, Canada, United States
- Agyneta simplicitarsis (Simon, 1884) – Europe, Russia (Europe to South Siberia), Kazakhstan
- Agyneta spicula Dupérré, 2013 – United States
- Agyneta spinifera Tanasevitch, 2020 – Kenya, Tanzania
- Agyneta straminicola (Millidge, 1991) – Colombia, Ecuador
- Agyneta subnivalis Tanasevitch, 1989 – Kazakhstan, Kyrgyzstan, Tajikistan
- Agyneta subtilis (O. Pickard-Cambridge, 1863) – Europe, Russia (Europe to South Siberia), China
- Agyneta suecica Holm, 1950 – Switzerland, Germany, Sweden, Finland, Russia (Europe, Urals)
- Agyneta tenuipes (Ono, 2007) – Japan
- Agyneta tianschanica Tanasevitch, 1989 – Kyrgyzstan
- Agyneta tibialis Tanasevitch, 2005 – Russia (Europe to South Siberia)
- Agyneta tincta (Jocqué, 1985) – Comoros
- Agyneta transversa (Banks, 1898) – Mexico
- Agyneta trifurcata Hippa & Oksala, 1985 – Finland, Russia (Middle Siberia to Far East)
- Agyneta tuberculata Dupérré, 2013 – United States
- Agyneta unguiserrata Cajade, 2023 – Brazil, Uruguay
- Agyneta unicornis (Tao, Li & Zhu, 1995) – China
- Agyneta unimaculata (Banks, 1892) – Canada, United States
- Agyneta usitata (Locket, 1968) – Nigeria, Angola
- Agyneta uta (Chamberlin, 1920) – United States
- Agyneta uzbekistanica Tanasevitch, 1984 – Uzbekistan, Kyrgyzstan
- Agyneta vera Wunderlich, 1976 – Australia (Queensland)
- Agyneta vinki Dupérré, 2013 – United States
- Agyneta watertoni Dupérré, 2013 – Canada
- Agyneta yukona Dupérré, 2013 – Canada
- Agyneta yulungiensis Wunderlich, 1983 – Nepal

The World Spider Catalogue documents the following names as nomina dubia, meaning that they are of unknown or dubious application.

- Agyneta lugubris (Blackwall, 1834)
- Agyneta resima (L. Koch, 1881)
- Agyneta tenera (Menge, 1869)
