= G. H. Locket =

British arachnologist

George Hazelwood Locket (12 October 1900 – 27 January 1991) was a British arachnologist who shared the 1974 H. H. Bloomer Award with A. F. Millidge. He and Millidge co-wrote British Spiders, volumes I and II. He studied at the University of Oxford.
