= A. basilewskyi =

A. basilewskyi may refer to:

- Abacetus basilewskyi, a ground beetle found in Mozambique
- Aethiothemis basilewskyi, a dragonfly found in Africa
- Afroeurydemus basilewskyi, a leaf beetle found in Africa
- Afroneta basilewskyi, a sheet weaver found in Tanzania
- Anthrenus basilewskyi, a carpet beetle found in Africa
