= A. congoensis =

A. congoensis may refer to:

- Abacetus congoensis, a ground beetle
- Aethioprocris congoensis, a moth found in the Congo
- Afroeurydemus congoensis, a leaf beetle found in the Congo
- Anauxesis congoensis, a longhorn beetle
- Asura congoensis, a moth found in the Congo
