= A. ituriensis =

A. ituriensis may refer to:

- Abacetus ituriensis, a ground beetle
- Afroeurydemus ituriensis, a leaf beetle found in the Congo
- Anthene ituriensis, a synonym of Anthene lutzi, a butterfly found in the Congo
