= A. bipunctatus =

A. bipunctatus may refer to:

- Abacetus bipunctatus, a ground beetle
- Adaina bipunctatus, a moth found in the United States, the Caribbean, and South America
- Afroeurydemus bipunctatus, a leaf beetle found in Africa
- Alburnoides bipunctatus, a freshwater fish found in Europe and Asia
- Argus bipunctatus or Argusianus bipunctatus, synonyms of Argusianus argus, the great argus, a pheasant found in Southeast Asia
- Asymphorodes bipunctatus, a moth found in French Polynesia
- Autochton bipunctatus, a butterfly found in the Americas
