= Afroeurydemus selmani =

Scientific classification
- Kingdom: Animalia
- Phylum: Arthropoda
- Clade: Pancrustacea
- Class: Insecta
- Order: Coleoptera
- Suborder: Polyphaga
- Infraorder: Cucujiformia
- Family: Chrysomelidae
- Genus: Afroeurydemus
- Species: A. selmani

Binomial name
- Afroeurydemus selmani Zoia, 2019

Synonyms
- Afroeurydemus signatus Selman, 1972 (nec (Pic, 1940))

Species of beetle

Afroeurydemus selmani is a species of leaf beetle of the Democratic Republic of the Congo. It was originally described by Brian J. Selman in 1972 as Afroeurydemus signatus. In 2019, this species became a homonym of Afroeurydemus signatus (Pic, 1940), a species formerly placed in Syagrus and moved to Afroeurydemus by Stefano Zoia. Selman's species was then renamed to Afroeurydemus selmani.
