= A. demoulini =

A. demoulini may refer to:

- Abacetus demoulini, a ground beetle
- Afroeurydemus demoulini, a leaf beetle found in the Congo
