= A. bredoi =

A. bredoi may refer to:

- Abacetus bredoi, a ground beetle
- Afroeurydemus bredoi, a leaf beetle found in the Congo
