= A. niger =

A. niger may refer to:

- Aaptos niger, a sea sponge
- Abacetus niger, a ground beetle
- Acanthus niger, a synonym of Acanthus mollis, a plant native to the Mediterranean
- Achalinus niger, a Taiwanese snake
- Acromyrmex niger, an ant species found in southern Brazil and Paraguay
- Afroeurydemus niger, a Congolese ground beetle
- Agelastes niger, the black guineafowl, a bird species found in humid forests of Central Africa
- Allocyttus niger, the black oreo, a fish species found around Australia and New Zealand
- Allogaster niger, a Nigerian longhorn beetle
- Amblytelus niger, a ground beetle
- Amphicrossus niger, a North American sap beetle
- Andricus niger, a gall wasp species in the genus Andricus
- Andropogon niger, a synonym of Sorghum bicolor, commonly called sorghum
- Aneides niger, the Santa Cruz black salamander
- Aparallactus niger, an African snake
- Aspergillus niger, the black mold, a fungus species
- Aspidophorus niger, a synonym of Agonopsis chiloensis, commonly called the snailfish
- Astronesthes niger, commonly known as the snaggletooth, a deep-sea fish
- Austropyrgus niger, a freshwater snail

== See also ==
- Niger (disambiguation)
