= Eryxia cinerascens =

Scientific classification
- Kingdom: Animalia
- Phylum: Arthropoda
- Clade: Pancrustacea
- Class: Insecta
- Order: Coleoptera
- Suborder: Polyphaga
- Infraorder: Cucujiformia
- Family: Chrysomelidae
- Genus: Eryxia
- Species: E. cinerascens

Binomial name
- Eryxia cinerascens (Fairmaire, 1894)

Synonyms
- Syagrus cinerascens Fairmaire, 1894

Species of beetle

Eryxia cinerascens is a species of leaf beetle from Senegal, described by Léon Fairmaire in 1894. It was originally described as a species of the genus Syagrus. It was transferred to the genus Eryxia in 2023, based on the original description and Fairmaire's statement that the species resembles Eryxia holosericea.
