= Microeurydemus adrarensis =

Scientific classification
- Kingdom: Animalia
- Phylum: Arthropoda
- Clade: Pancrustacea
- Class: Insecta
- Order: Coleoptera
- Suborder: Polyphaga
- Infraorder: Cucujiformia
- Family: Chrysomelidae
- Genus: Microeurydemus
- Species: M. adrarensis

Binomial name
- Microeurydemus adrarensis (Pic, 1942)

Synonyms
- Syagrus adrarensis Pic, 1942

Species of beetle

Microeurydemus adrarensis is a species of leaf beetle from Algeria, described from the locality of Adrar des Ifoghas by Maurice Pic in 1942. It was originally described as a species of the genus Syagrus. It was transferred to the genus Microeurydemus in 2023. No further records of the species have been published since Pic's description.
