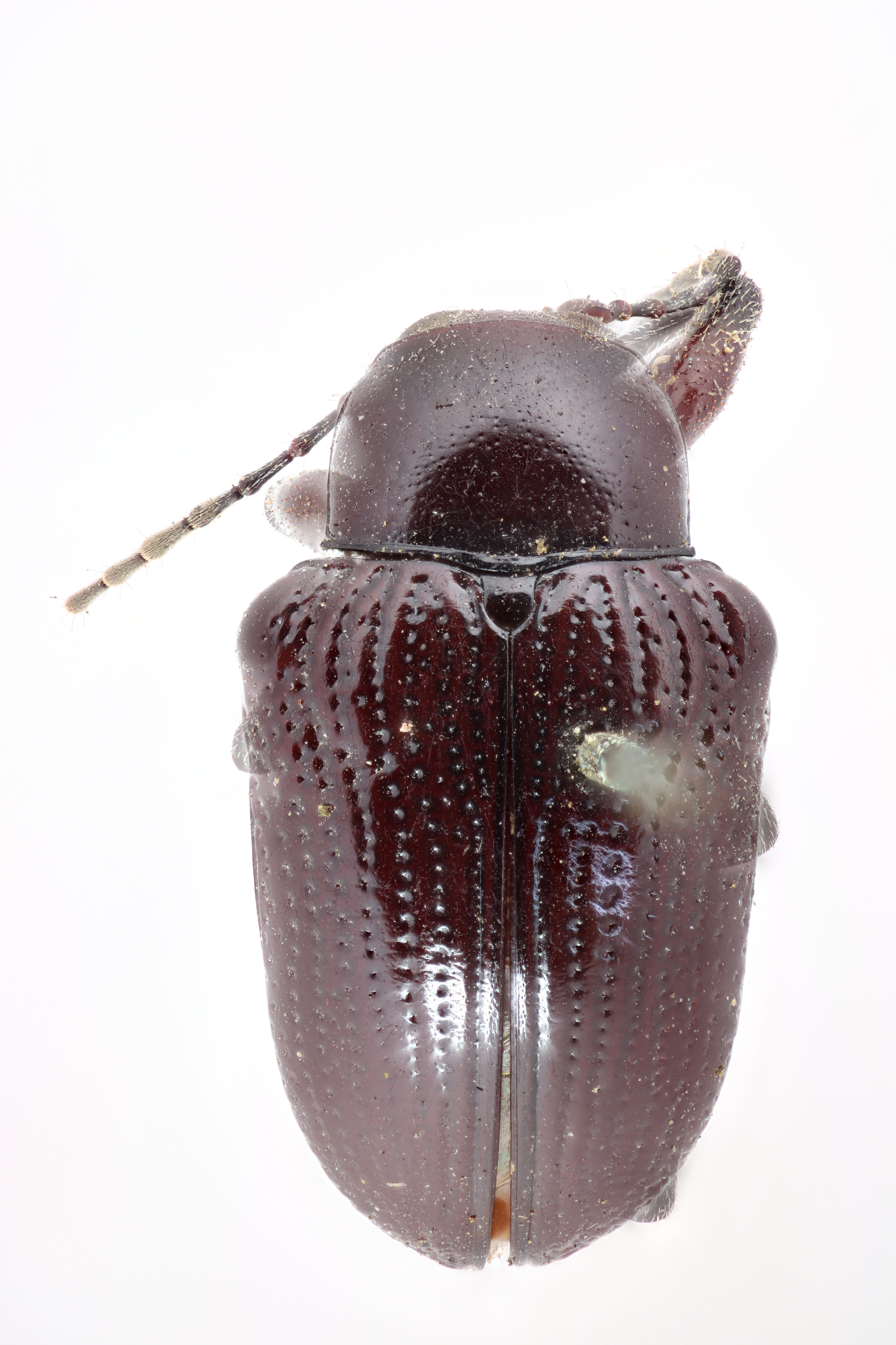
- Eurydemus grandis

Scientific classification
- Kingdom: Animalia
- Phylum: Arthropoda
- Clade: Pancrustacea
- Class: Insecta
- Order: Coleoptera
- Suborder: Polyphaga
- Infraorder: Cucujiformia
- Family: Chrysomelidae
- Subfamily: Eumolpinae
- Tribe: Typophorini
- Genus: Eurydemus; Chapuis, 1874

Type species
- Eurydemus insignis (= Rhyparida grandis Baly, 1861) Chapuis, 1874

= Eurydemus =

Genus of leaf beetles

Eurydemus is a genus of leaf beetles in the subfamily Eumolpinae. It is known from the South Pacific, though many additional species have been described from Africa.

== Taxonomy ==
The genus was first erected by the French entomologist Félicien Chapuis for a single species, Eurydemus insignis, reported from Australia and later Fiji. This species was later found to be a junior synonym of Rhyparida grandis, which itself was originally reported from New Caledonia. However, both the records from Australia and New Caledonia are possibly erroneous.

In 1965, British entomologist Brian J. Selman revised the genus, transferring all African species in it seen by him to Afroeurydemus and other related African genera. He suggested that it was almost certain Eurydemus was restricted to Fiji.

== Species ==
South Pacific species:

- Eurydemus grandis (Baly, 1861) – Solomon Islands, Vanuatu, Fiji
- Eurydemus trispilus Gómez-Zurita, 2024 – Bougainville

African species:

- Eurydemus congoensis Burgeon, 1942 – DR Congo
- Eurydemus depressus Lefèvre, 1890 – Botswana
- Eurydemus femoralis Bryant, 1954 – Guinea, Côte d'Ivoire, Equatorial Guinea
- Eurydemus hartmanni Harold, 1877 – Sudan
- Eurydemus limbatipennis Achard, 1915 – Tanzania
- Eurydemus lineatocollis Burgeon, 1941 – DR Congo
- Eurydemus oculatus Chapuis, 1879 – Ethiopia
- Eurydemus plagiatus Achard, 1915 – Tanzania
- Eurydemus raffrayi Lefèvre, 1891 – Tanzania
- Eurydemus richardi Burgeon, 1941 – DR Congo
- Eurydemus sobrinus Weise, 1903 – Tanzania
- Eurydemus villiersi Burgeon, 1941 – Cameroon
- Eurydemus vittatus Gestro, 1895 – Ethiopia, Somalia

Madagascar species:

- Eurydemus aciculatopunctatus Bechyné, 1964 – Madagascar
- Eurydemus aeneus Jacoby, 1897 – Madagascar
- Eurydemus amabilis Brancsik, 1893 – Madagascar
- Eurydemus carbonarius Bechyné, 1964 – Madagascar
- Eurydemus confinis Bechyné, 1964 – Madagascar
- Eurydemus diadematus Bechyné, 1964
  - Eurydemus diadematus diadematus Bechyné, 1964 – Madagascar
  - Eurydemus diadematus marianus Bechyné, 1964 – Madagascar
- Eurydemus freyi Bechyné, 1964 – Madagascar
- Eurydemus illustris Bechyné, 1947 – Madagascar
- Eurydemus impressicollis (Fairmaire, 1869) – Madagascar
- Eurydemus jodasi Bechyné, 1964 – Madagascar
- Eurydemus metallicus Jacoby, 1892
  - Eurydemus metallicus metallicus Jacoby, 1892 – Madagascar
  - Eurydemus metallicus sculpturatus Bechyné, 1956 – Madagascar
- Eurydemus micheli Bechyné, 1947 – Madagascar
- Eurydemus onerosus Bechyné, 1947 – Madagascar
- Eurydemus ophthalmicus Bechyné, 1947 – Madagascar
- Eurydemus praequestus Bechyné, 1947 – Madagascar
- Eurydemus subimpressus (Fairmaire, 1902) – Madagascar

Species moved to Microeurydemus:

- Eurydemus airensis Pic, 1950
