= Afroeurydemus caliginosus =

Scientific classification
- Kingdom: Animalia
- Phylum: Arthropoda
- Clade: Pancrustacea
- Class: Insecta
- Order: Coleoptera
- Suborder: Polyphaga
- Infraorder: Cucujiformia
- Family: Chrysomelidae
- Genus: Afroeurydemus
- Species: A. caliginosus

Binomial name
- Afroeurydemus caliginosus (Lefèvre, 1891)

Synonyms
- Syagrus caliginosus Lefèvre, 1891

Species of leaf beetle

Afroeurydemus caliginosus is a species of leaf beetle from Tanzania and the Democratic Republic of the Congo. It was first described by Édouard Lefèvre in 1891, as a species of Syagrus.

== Subspecies ==
There are two subspecies of A. caliginosus:

- Afroeurydemus caliginosus caliginosus (Lefèvre, 1891): The nominotypical subspecies. Found in Tanzania.
- Afroeurydemus caliginosus discalis (Burgeon, 1941): Found in the Democratic Republic of the Congo.
