= Afroeurydemus hopei =

Scientific classification
- Kingdom: Animalia
- Phylum: Arthropoda
- Clade: Pancrustacea
- Class: Insecta
- Order: Coleoptera
- Suborder: Polyphaga
- Infraorder: Cucujiformia
- Family: Chrysomelidae
- Genus: Afroeurydemus
- Species: A. hopei

Binomial name
- Afroeurydemus hopei (Bryant, 1938)

Synonyms
- Syagrus hopei Bryant, 1938

Species of beetle

Afroeurydemus hopei is a species of leaf beetle found in central and eastern Africa. It was first described by Gilbert Ernest Bryant in 1938, as a species of Syagrus, from the locality of Hope Fountain in Zimbabwe.

== Distribution ==
A. hopei is recorded from Zimbabwe, the Republic of the Congo, the Democratic Republic of the Congo, Zambia and South Africa.
