= Microeurydemus wraniki =

Scientific classification
- Kingdom: Animalia
- Phylum: Arthropoda
- Clade: Pancrustacea
- Class: Insecta
- Order: Coleoptera
- Suborder: Polyphaga
- Infraorder: Cucujiformia
- Family: Chrysomelidae
- Genus: Microeurydemus
- Species: M. wraniki

Binomial name
- Microeurydemus wraniki Lopatin in Lopatin & Konstantinov, 1994

Species of beetle

Microeurydemus wraniki is a species of leaf beetle of Yemen, described by Igor Lopatin in 1994.
