= Anauxesis rufoscapa =

Scientific classification
- Kingdom: Animalia
- Phylum: Arthropoda
- Class: Insecta
- Order: Coleoptera
- Suborder: Polyphaga
- Infraorder: Cucujiformia
- Family: Cerambycidae
- Genus: Anauxesis
- Species: A. rufoscapa

Binomial name
- Anauxesis rufoscapa Breuning, 1950

Species of beetle

Anauxesis rufoscapa is a species of beetle in the family Cerambycidae. It was described by Stephan von Breuning in 1950.
