= Afroeurydemus bimaculatus =

Scientific classification
- Kingdom: Animalia
- Phylum: Arthropoda
- Clade: Pancrustacea
- Class: Insecta
- Order: Coleoptera
- Suborder: Polyphaga
- Infraorder: Cucujiformia
- Family: Chrysomelidae
- Genus: Afroeurydemus
- Species: A. bimaculatus

Binomial name
- Afroeurydemus bimaculatus (Lefèvre, 1877)

Synonyms
- Syagrus bimaculatus Lefèvre, 1877

Species of beetle

Afroeurydemus bimaculatus is a species of leaf beetle of Ivory Coast, Gabon, the Republic of the Congo and the Democratic Republic of the Congo. It was first described by Édouard Lefèvre in 1877.
