= Anauxesis perrieri =

Scientific classification
- Kingdom: Animalia
- Phylum: Arthropoda
- Class: Insecta
- Order: Coleoptera
- Suborder: Polyphaga
- Infraorder: Cucujiformia
- Family: Cerambycidae
- Genus: Anauxesis
- Species: A. perrieri

Binomial name
- Anauxesis perrieri Fairmaire, 1902

Species of beetle

Anauxesis perrieri is a species of beetle in the family Cerambycidae. It was described by Fairmaire in 1902.
