= Afroeurydemus puncticollis =

Scientific classification
- Kingdom: Animalia
- Phylum: Arthropoda
- Clade: Pancrustacea
- Class: Insecta
- Order: Coleoptera
- Suborder: Polyphaga
- Infraorder: Cucujiformia
- Family: Chrysomelidae
- Genus: Afroeurydemus
- Species: A. puncticollis

Binomial name
- Afroeurydemus puncticollis (Bryant, 1933)

Synonyms
- Syagrus puncticollis Bryant, 1933

Species of beetle

Afroeurydemus puncticollis is a species of leaf beetle. It is distributed in the Democratic Republic of the Congo and Ethiopia. It was described by Gilbert Ernest Bryant in 1933.
