= Anauxesis elongata =

Scientific classification
- Domain: Eukaryota
- Kingdom: Animalia
- Phylum: Arthropoda
- Class: Insecta
- Order: Coleoptera
- Suborder: Polyphaga
- Infraorder: Cucujiformia
- Family: Cerambycidae
- Genus: Anauxesis
- Species: A. elongata

Binomial name
- Anauxesis elongata (Brancsik, 1897)

Species of beetle

Anauxesis elongata is a species of beetle in the family Cerambycidae. It was described by Brancsik in 1897.
