= Eryxia baikiei =

Scientific classification
- Kingdom: Animalia
- Phylum: Arthropoda
- Clade: Pancrustacea
- Class: Insecta
- Order: Coleoptera
- Suborder: Polyphaga
- Infraorder: Cucujiformia
- Family: Chrysomelidae
- Genus: Eryxia
- Species: E. baikiei

Binomial name
- Eryxia baikiei Baly, 1865

Species of beetle

Eryxia baikiei is a species of leaf beetle of Mali and Senegal. It was first described by Joseph Sugar Baly in 1865, based on an unstated number of specimens sent to him by Scottish explorer and naturalist William Balfour Baikie, who had collected the species from the banks of the Niger River.
