= Afroeurydemus maculipennis =

Scientific classification
- Kingdom: Animalia
- Phylum: Arthropoda
- Clade: Pancrustacea
- Class: Insecta
- Order: Coleoptera
- Suborder: Polyphaga
- Infraorder: Cucujiformia
- Family: Chrysomelidae
- Genus: Afroeurydemus
- Species: A. maculipennis

Binomial name
- Afroeurydemus maculipennis (Jacoby, 1900)

Synonyms
- Eurydemus maculipennis Jacoby, 1900

Species of beetle

Afroeurydemus maculipennis is a species of leaf beetle of the Democratic Republic of the Congo, described by Martin Jacoby in 1900.
