= Anauxesis elongatoides =

Scientific classification
- Kingdom: Animalia
- Phylum: Arthropoda
- Class: Insecta
- Order: Coleoptera
- Suborder: Polyphaga
- Infraorder: Cucujiformia
- Family: Cerambycidae
- Genus: Anauxesis
- Species: A. elongatoides

Binomial name
- Anauxesis elongatoides Breuning, 1949

Species of beetle

Anauxesis elongatoides is a species of beetle in the family Cerambycidae. It was described by Stephan von Breuning (entomologist) in 1949.
