= Afroeurydemus nigricornis =

Scientific classification
- Kingdom: Animalia
- Phylum: Arthropoda
- Clade: Pancrustacea
- Class: Insecta
- Order: Coleoptera
- Suborder: Polyphaga
- Infraorder: Cucujiformia
- Family: Chrysomelidae
- Genus: Afroeurydemus
- Species: A. nigricornis

Binomial name
- Afroeurydemus nigricornis Selman, 1972

Species of beetle

Afroeurydemus nigricornis is a species of leaf beetle reported from the Republic of the Congo, the Democratic Republic of the Congo and Ivory Coast. It was first described from Garamba National Park by Brian J. Selman in 1972. Its host plants include the flowers of Lamiaceae and Rubiaceae.
