= Syagrus puncticollis =

Scientific classification
- Kingdom: Animalia
- Phylum: Arthropoda
- Clade: Pancrustacea
- Class: Insecta
- Order: Coleoptera
- Suborder: Polyphaga
- Infraorder: Cucujiformia
- Family: Chrysomelidae
- Genus: Syagrus
- Species: S. puncticollis

Binomial name
- Syagrus puncticollis (Harold, 1877)

Synonyms
- Rhembastus puncticollis Harold, 1877; Menius concinnicollis Baly, 1878

Species of beetle

Syagrus puncticollis is a species of leaf beetle widely distributed across sub-Saharan Africa. It was first described by the German entomologist Edgar von Harold in 1877. Host plants for the species include Erythrophleum guineense.

== Distribution ==
Syagrus puncticollis is recorded from Guinea, Sierra Leone, South Sudan, Democratic Republic of the Congo, Malawi and Mozambique.
