= Afroeurydemus distinctus =

Scientific classification
- Kingdom: Animalia
- Phylum: Arthropoda
- Clade: Pancrustacea
- Class: Insecta
- Order: Coleoptera
- Suborder: Polyphaga
- Infraorder: Cucujiformia
- Family: Chrysomelidae
- Genus: Afroeurydemus
- Species: A. distinctus

Binomial name
- Afroeurydemus distinctus Selman, 1972

Species of beetle

Afroeurydemus distinctus is a species of leaf beetle reported from the Republic of the Congo and the Democratic Republic of the Congo. It was first described from Garamba National Park by Brian J. Selman in 1972. Its host plants include Grewia mollis and Annona senegalensis, and it has also been reported on flowers of Cyperus acericomus.
