= Anauxesis calabarica =

Scientific classification
- Domain: Eukaryota
- Kingdom: Animalia
- Phylum: Arthropoda
- Class: Insecta
- Order: Coleoptera
- Suborder: Polyphaga
- Infraorder: Cucujiformia
- Family: Cerambycidae
- Genus: Anauxesis
- Species: A. calabarica

Binomial name
- Anauxesis calabarica (Chevrolat, 1855)

Species of beetle

Anauxesis calabarica is a species of beetle in the family Cerambycidae. It was described by Louis Alexandre Auguste Chevrolat in 1855.
