= Anauxesis cincticornis =

Scientific classification
- Domain: Eukaryota
- Kingdom: Animalia
- Phylum: Arthropoda
- Class: Insecta
- Order: Coleoptera
- Suborder: Polyphaga
- Infraorder: Cucujiformia
- Family: Cerambycidae
- Genus: Anauxesis
- Species: A. cincticornis

Binomial name
- Anauxesis cincticornis (Pascoe, 1857)

Species of beetle

Anauxesis cincticornis is a species of beetle in the family Cerambycidae. It was described by Francis Polkinghorne Pascoe in 1857.
