= Syagrus calcaratus =

Scientific classification
- Kingdom: Animalia
- Phylum: Arthropoda
- Clade: Pancrustacea
- Class: Insecta
- Order: Coleoptera
- Suborder: Polyphaga
- Infraorder: Cucujiformia
- Family: Chrysomelidae
- Genus: Syagrus
- Species: S. calcaratus

Binomial name
- Syagrus calcaratus (Fabricius, 1775)

Synonyms
- Cryptocephalus calcaratus Fabricius, 1775; Typophorus buqueti Dejean, 1837 (nomen nudum); Brevicolaspis ruficollis J. Thomson, 1858; Syagrus buqueti Chapuis, 1874; Syagrus ruficollis Lefèvre, 1875

Species of beetle

Syagrus calcaratus is a species of leaf beetle widely distributed across sub-Saharan Africa. It was first described by Johan Christian Fabricius in 1775, in his major work Systema entomologiae.

Syagrus calcaratus is a pest of cotton. The larvae attack the roots of the plant and cause it to wilt. Other host plants for the species include Parinari curatellifolia.

== Distribution ==
Syagrus calcaratus is recorded from Senegal, Guinea Bissau, Guinea, Sierra Leone, Ivory Coast, Burkina Faso, Togo, Benin, Nigeria, Cameroon, Central African Republic, South Sudan, Gabon, Congo Republic, DR Congo, Uganda, Angola, Zambia and Zimbabwe.
