= Syagrus sehranus =

Scientific classification
- Kingdom: Animalia
- Phylum: Arthropoda
- Clade: Pancrustacea
- Class: Insecta
- Order: Coleoptera
- Suborder: Polyphaga
- Infraorder: Cucujiformia
- Family: Chrysomelidae
- Genus: Syagrus
- Species: S. sehranus

Binomial name
- Syagrus sehranus Aslam, 1968

Synonyms
- Syagrus viridicollis Pic, 1942 (nec Pic, 1940)

Species of beetle

Syagrus sehranus is a species of leaf beetle from Algeria. It is a replacement name introduced by N. A. Aslam in 1968 for Syagrus viridicollis Pic, 1942, a junior homonym of Syagrus viridicollis Pic, 1940 (now known as Paraivongius viridicollis). It was first described from the locality of Adrar des Ifoghas by Maurice Pic in 1942. No further records of the species have been published since Pic's description.
