= Afroneta =

Scientific classification
- Kingdom: Animalia
- Phylum: Arthropoda
- Subphylum: Chelicerata
- Class: Arachnida
- Order: Araneae
- Infraorder: Araneomorphae
- Family: Linyphiidae
- Genus: Afroneta; Holm, 1968

Type species
- A. immaculata Holm, 1968

Species
- 29, see text

Genus of spiders

Afroneta is a genus of dwarf spiders that was first described by Å. Holm in 1968.

== Species ==
As of May 2019 it contained twenty-nine species:

- Afroneta altivaga Holm, 1968 – Congo
- Afroneta annulata Merrett, 2004 – Congo
- Afroneta bamilekei Bosmans, 1988 – Cameroon
- Afroneta basilewskyi Holm, 1968 – Tanzania
- Afroneta blesti Merrett & Russell-Smith, 1996 – Ethiopia
- Afroneta elgonensis Merrett, 2004 – Kenya
- Afroneta erecta Merrett, 2004 – Congo
- Afroneta flavescens Frick & Scharff, 2018 – Kenya
- Afroneta fulva Merrett, 2004 – Congo
- Afroneta fusca Merrett, 2004 – Congo
- Afroneta guttata Holm, 1968 – Congo
- Afroneta immaculata Holm, 1968 (type) – Congo
- Afroneta immaculoides Merrett, 2004 – Congo
- Afroneta lativulva Merrett, 2004 – Congo
- Afroneta lobeliae Merrett, 2004 – Congo
- Afroneta longipalpis Ledoux & Attié, 2008 – Réunion
- Afroneta longispinosa Holm, 1968 – Congo
- Afroneta maculata Merrett, 2004 – Congo
- Afroneta millidgei Merrett & Russell-Smith, 1996 – Ethiopia
- Afroneta pallens Merrett, 2004 – Congo
- Afroneta picta Holm, 1968 – Congo
- Afroneta praticola Holm, 1968 – Tanzania
- Afroneta sarahae Frick & Scharff, 2018 – Kenya
- Afroneta serrata Frick & Scharff, 2018 – Kenya
- Afroneta snazelli Merrett & Russell-Smith, 1996 – Ethiopia
- Afroneta subfusca Holm, 1968 – Congo
- Afroneta subfuscoides Merrett, 2004 – Congo
- Afroneta tenuivulva Merrett, 2004 – Congo
- Afroneta tristis Merrett, 2004 – Congo
