= Eryxia annobioides =

Scientific classification
- Kingdom: Animalia
- Phylum: Arthropoda
- Clade: Pancrustacea
- Class: Insecta
- Order: Coleoptera
- Suborder: Polyphaga
- Infraorder: Cucujiformia
- Family: Chrysomelidae
- Genus: Eryxia
- Species: E. annobioides

Binomial name
- Eryxia annobioides Escalera, 1914

Species of beetle

Eryxia annobioides is a species of leaf beetle from Morocco. It was first described by Spanish entomologist Manuel Martínez de la Escalera in 1914.
