= Anauxesis simplex =

Scientific classification
- Domain: Eukaryota
- Kingdom: Animalia
- Phylum: Arthropoda
- Class: Insecta
- Order: Coleoptera
- Suborder: Polyphaga
- Infraorder: Cucujiformia
- Family: Cerambycidae
- Genus: Anauxesis
- Species: A. simplex

Binomial name
- Anauxesis simplex Jordan, 1904

Species of beetle

Anauxesis simplex is a species of beetle in the family Cerambycidae. It was described by Karl Jordan in 1904.
