= Afroeurydemus uniformis =

Scientific classification
- Kingdom: Animalia
- Phylum: Arthropoda
- Clade: Pancrustacea
- Class: Insecta
- Order: Coleoptera
- Suborder: Polyphaga
- Infraorder: Cucujiformia
- Family: Chrysomelidae
- Genus: Afroeurydemus
- Species: A. uniformis

Binomial name
- Afroeurydemus uniformis Selman, 1972

Species of beetle

Afroeurydemus uniformis is a species of leaf beetle reported from the Republic of the Congo and Democratic Republic of the Congo. It was first described from Garamba National Park by Brian J. Selman in 1972. Its host plants include Rubiaceae, Cyperus papyrus and Ficus vallis-choudae.
