= Afroeurydemus armatus =

Scientific classification
- Kingdom: Animalia
- Phylum: Arthropoda
- Clade: Pancrustacea
- Class: Insecta
- Order: Coleoptera
- Suborder: Polyphaga
- Infraorder: Cucujiformia
- Family: Chrysomelidae
- Genus: Afroeurydemus
- Species: A. armatus

Binomial name
- Afroeurydemus armatus (Achard, 1915)

Synonyms
- Eurydemus armatus Achard, 1915

Species of beetle

Afroeurydemus armatus is a species of leaf beetle of the Republic of the Congo and the Democratic Republic of the Congo, described by Julien Achard in 1915.
