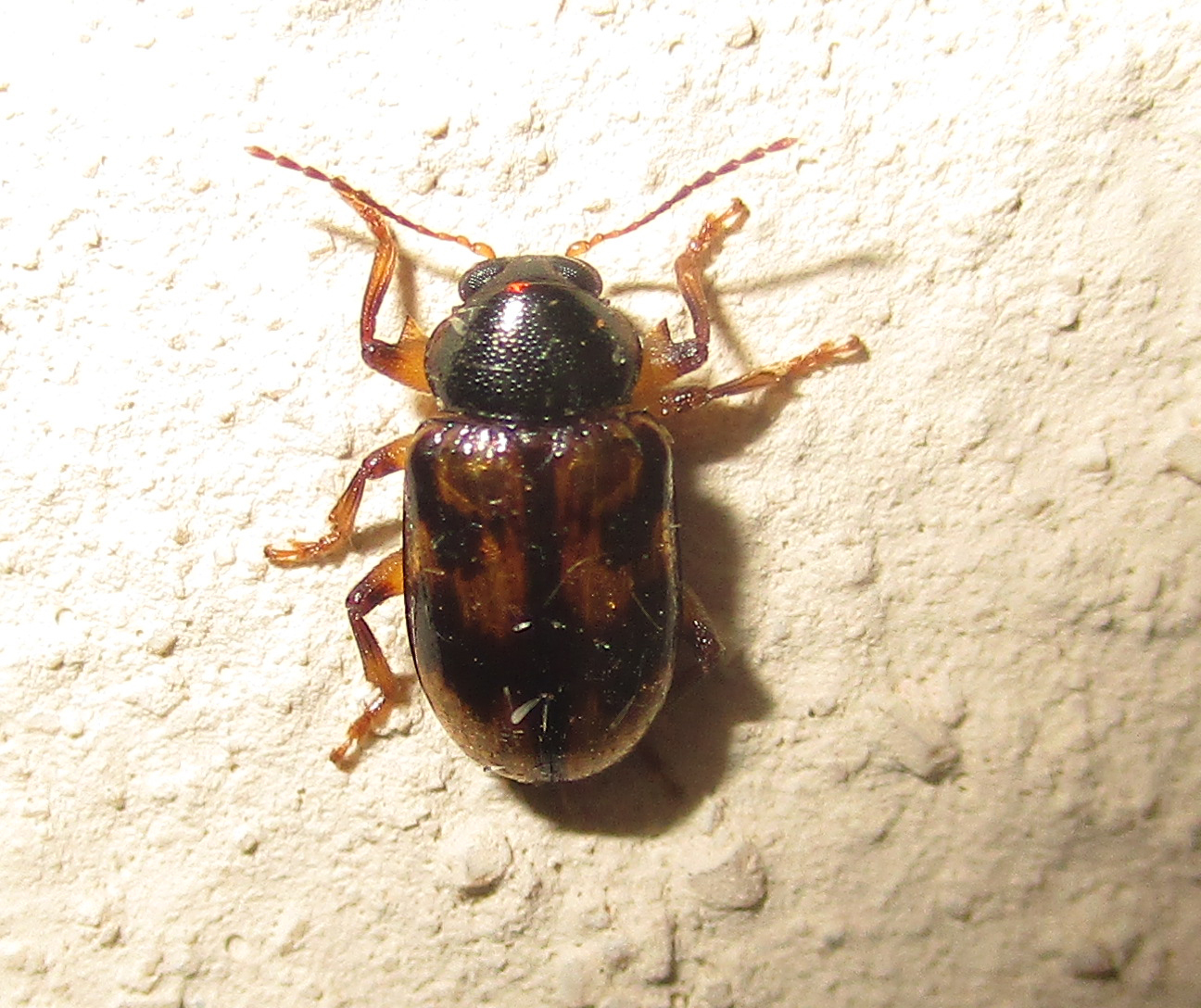
- Microeurydemus africanus, Botswana

Scientific classification
- Kingdom: Animalia
- Phylum: Arthropoda
- Clade: Pancrustacea
- Class: Insecta
- Order: Coleoptera
- Suborder: Polyphaga
- Infraorder: Cucujiformia
- Family: Chrysomelidae
- Genus: Microeurydemus
- Species: M. africanus

Binomial name
- Microeurydemus africanus (Jacoby, 1900)

Synonyms
- Pseudosyagrus africanus Jacoby, 1900

= Microeurydemus africanus =

Species of beetle

Microeurydemus africanus is a species of leaf beetle that is widely distributed in southern and eastern Africa. It was first described by Martin Jacoby in 1900, as a species of Pseudosyagrus, from "Matabeleland, near Tati" (today in northeast Botswana).

== Distribution ==
M. africanus is recorded in Botswana, Saudi Arabia, Yemen, Eritrea, South Sudan (Equatoria), Chad, Namibia, Kenya, Tanzania and South Africa.
