= Anauxesis nigroantennalis =

Scientific classification
- Kingdom: Animalia
- Phylum: Arthropoda
- Class: Insecta
- Order: Coleoptera
- Suborder: Polyphaga
- Infraorder: Cucujiformia
- Family: Cerambycidae
- Genus: Anauxesis
- Species: A. nigroantennalis

Binomial name
- Anauxesis nigroantennalis Breuning, 1955

Species of beetle

Anauxesis nigroantennalis is a species of beetle in the family Cerambycidae. It was described by Stephan von Breuning in 1955.
