= Anauxesis rufipennis =

Scientific classification
- Kingdom: Animalia
- Phylum: Arthropoda
- Class: Insecta
- Order: Coleoptera
- Suborder: Polyphaga
- Infraorder: Cucujiformia
- Family: Cerambycidae
- Genus: Anauxesis
- Species: A. rufipennis

Binomial name
- Anauxesis rufipennis Breuning, 1976

Species of beetle

Anauxesis rufipennis is a species of beetle in the family Cerambycidae. It was described by Stephan von Breuning in 1976.
