= Microeurydemus semivittatus =

Scientific classification
- Kingdom: Animalia
- Phylum: Arthropoda
- Clade: Pancrustacea
- Class: Insecta
- Order: Coleoptera
- Suborder: Polyphaga
- Infraorder: Cucujiformia
- Family: Chrysomelidae
- Genus: Microeurydemus
- Species: M. semivittatus

Binomial name
- Microeurydemus semivittatus (Jacoby, 1899)

Synonyms
- Eurydemus semivittatus Jacoby, 1899

Species of beetle

Microeurydemus semivittatus is a species of leaf beetle. It is distributed in Somalia, Saudi Arabia and Yemen. It was first described by Martin Jacoby in 1899.
