= Afroneta bamilekei =

Scientific classification
- Kingdom: Animalia
- Phylum: Arthropoda
- Subphylum: Chelicerata
- Class: Arachnida
- Order: Araneae
- Infraorder: Araneomorphae
- Family: Linyphiidae
- Genus: Afroneta
- Species: A. bamilekei

Binomial name
- Afroneta bamilekei Bosmans, 1988

Species of spider

Afroneta bamilekei is a species of sheet weaver found in Cameroon. It was described by Bosmans in 1988.
