= Microsyagrus recticollis =

Scientific classification
- Kingdom: Animalia
- Phylum: Arthropoda
- Clade: Pancrustacea
- Class: Insecta
- Order: Coleoptera
- Suborder: Polyphaga
- Infraorder: Cucujiformia
- Family: Chrysomelidae
- Genus: Microsyagrus
- Species: M. recticollis

Binomial name
- Microsyagrus recticollis (Pic, 1949)

Synonyms
- Syagrus recticollis Pic, 1949

Species of beetle

Microsyagrus recticollis is a species of leaf beetle from Tanzania and the Democratic Republic of the Congo, described by Maurice Pic in 1949.
