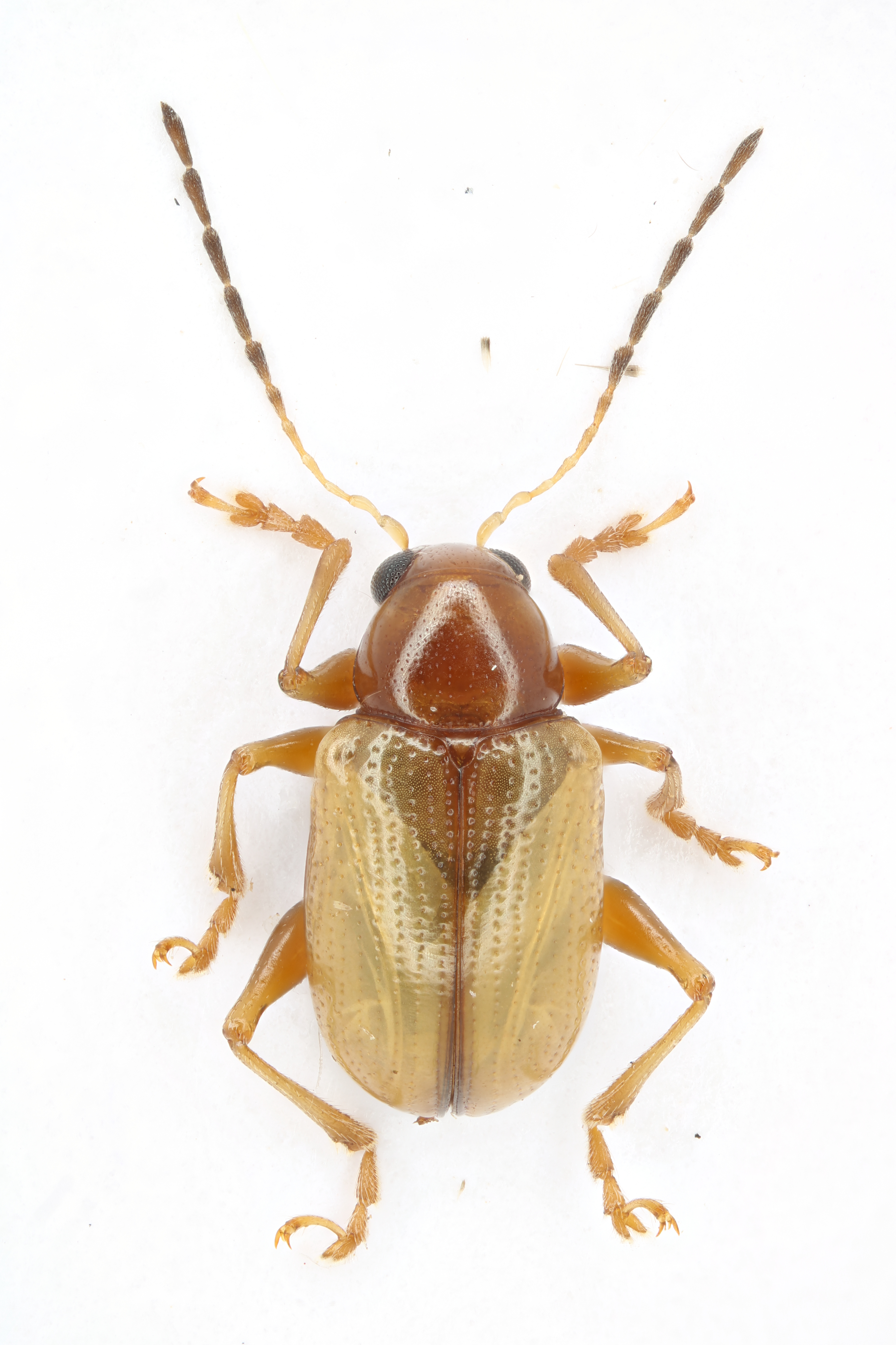
- Microsyagrus sp.; Tempue, Cuanavale Source Lake

Scientific classification
- Kingdom: Animalia
- Phylum: Arthropoda
- Clade: Pancrustacea
- Class: Insecta
- Order: Coleoptera
- Suborder: Polyphaga
- Infraorder: Cucujiformia
- Family: Chrysomelidae
- Subfamily: Eumolpinae
- Tribe: Typophorini
- Genus: Microsyagrus; Pic, 1952

Type species
- Microsyagrus trinotatus (= Microsyagrus punctaticollis Zoia, 2019) Pic, 1952

= Microsyagrus =

Genus of leaf beetles from Africa

Microsyagrus is a genus of leaf beetles in the subfamily Eumolpinae. It is known from Africa. Many of the species were formerly placed in Syagrus.

== Species ==
- Microsyagrus angolensis (Pic, 1939) – Angola
- Microsyagrus atriventris (Pic, 1939) – Tanzania
- Microsyagrus bingeri (Pic, 1949) – Ivory Coast
- Microsyagrus bingervillensis Selman, 1973 – Ivory Coast, Ghana
- Microsyagrus discoidalis (Pic, 1940) – Angola
- (?)Microsyagrus discomaculatus (Pic, 1939) – Angola
- Microsyagrus favareli (Pic, 1938) – Central Africa Republic
- Microsyagrus fulvimanus (Jacoby, 1904) – Mozambique, Zambia, Zimbabwe
- Microsyagrus gabonicus (Pic, 1949) – Gabon
- Microsyagrus gossypii (Bryant, 1933) – Ivory Coast, Nigeria
- Microsyagrus immaculatus (Pic, 1949) – Congo
- Microsyagrus insignitus (Jacoby, 1898) – South Africa
- Microsyagrus laurenti (Pic, 1949) – Senegal
- Microsyagrus maculosus (Lefèvre, 1891) – Tanzania (Zanzibar)
- Microsyagrus madoni (Pic, 1940) – Gabon
- Microsyagrus marshalli Selman, 1965 – South Africa, Namibia, Botswana, Zambia, Zimbabwe, Tanzania, Somalia
- Microsyagrus mashonanus (Jacoby, 1897) – Zimbabwe, Ethiopia
- Microsyagrus notatus Pic, 1952 – Benin
- Microsyagrus punctaticollis Zoia, 2019 – Benin
- Microsyagrus raffrayi (Pic, 1940) – Ethiopia
- Microsyagrus recticollis (Pic, 1949) – Tanzania, DR Congo
- Microsyagrus rosae (Bryant, 1936) – Uganda, DR Congo
- Microsyagrus saegeri Selman, 1972 – DR Congo
- Microsyagrus testaceonotatus (Pic, 1940) – Central African Republic
- Microsyagrus trinotatus (Pic, 1939) – Angola
- Microsyagrus unicolor Pic, 1952 – Benin
- Microsyagrus variabilis Selman, 1972 – DR Congo
- Microsyagrus zeae (Bryant, 1948) – Senegal

Species moved to Afroeurydemus:

- Microsyagrus annulipes Pic, 1952
- Microsyagrus cribricollis Pic, 1952: renamed to Afroeurydemus fortesculptus Zoia, 2019

Other synonyms:

- Microsyagrus trinotatus Pic, 1952: renamed to Microsyagrus punctaticollis Zoia, 2019
