= Eryxia confusa =

Scientific classification
- Kingdom: Animalia
- Phylum: Arthropoda
- Clade: Pancrustacea
- Class: Insecta
- Order: Coleoptera
- Suborder: Polyphaga
- Infraorder: Cucujiformia
- Family: Chrysomelidae
- Genus: Eryxia
- Species: E. confusa

Binomial name
- Eryxia confusa Selman, 1972

Species of beetle

Eryxia confusa is a species of leaf beetle reported from the Republic of the Congo and the Democratic Republic of the Congo. It was first described from Garamba National Park by Brian J. Selman in 1972. Its host plants include Canthium sp.
