= Eryxia gracilipes =

Scientific classification
- Kingdom: Animalia
- Phylum: Arthropoda
- Clade: Pancrustacea
- Class: Insecta
- Order: Coleoptera
- Suborder: Polyphaga
- Infraorder: Cucujiformia
- Family: Chrysomelidae
- Genus: Eryxia
- Species: E. gracilipes

Binomial name
- Eryxia gracilipes Lefèvre, 1890

Species of beetle

Eryxia gracilipes is a species of leaf beetle of Yemen, described by Édouard Lefèvre in 1890.
