= Afroneta longipalpis =

Scientific classification
- Kingdom: Animalia
- Phylum: Arthropoda
- Subphylum: Chelicerata
- Class: Arachnida
- Order: Araneae
- Infraorder: Araneomorphae
- Family: Linyphiidae
- Genus: Afroneta
- Species: A. longipalpis

Binomial name
- Afroneta longipalpis Ledoux & Attié, 2008

Species of spider

Afroneta longipalpis is a species of sheet weaver found in Reunion. It was described by Ledoux & Attié in 2008.
