= Afroneta maculata =

Scientific classification
- Kingdom: Animalia
- Phylum: Arthropoda
- Subphylum: Chelicerata
- Class: Arachnida
- Order: Araneae
- Infraorder: Araneomorphae
- Family: Linyphiidae
- Genus: Afroneta
- Species: A. maculata

Binomial name
- Afroneta maculata Merrett, 2004

Species of spider

Afroneta maculata is a species of sheet weaver found in the Congo. It was described by Merrett in 2004.
