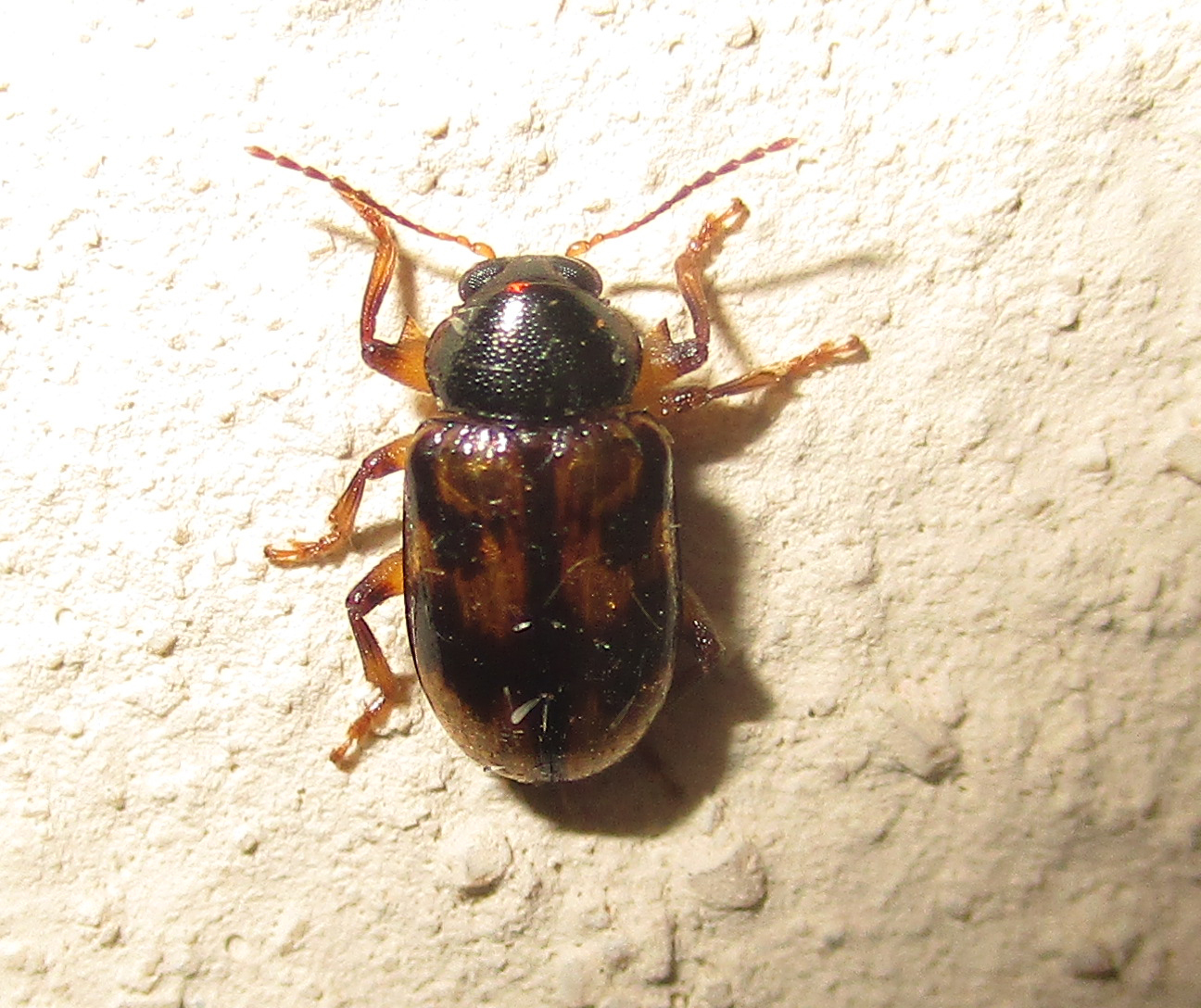
- Microeurydemus africanus, Botswana

Scientific classification
- Kingdom: Animalia
- Phylum: Arthropoda
- Clade: Pancrustacea
- Class: Insecta
- Order: Coleoptera
- Suborder: Polyphaga
- Infraorder: Cucujiformia
- Family: Chrysomelidae
- Subfamily: Eumolpinae
- Tribe: Typophorini
- Genus: Microeurydemus; Pic, 1938

Type species
- Microeurydemus unimaculatus Pic, 1938

= Microeurydemus =

Genus of leaf beetles

Microeurydemus is a genus of leaf beetles in the subfamily Eumolpinae. It is known from Africa and the Arabian Peninsula.

== Species ==
- Microeurydemus adrarensis (Pic, 1942) – Algeria: Adrar des Ifoghas
- Microeurydemus africanus (Jacoby, 1900) – southern and eastern Africa
- Microeurydemus airensis (Pic, 1950) – Niger (Agadez)
- Microeurydemus fasciolatus (Fairmaire, 1893) – Somalia
- Microeurydemus flavescens (Bryant, 1942) – Saudi Arabia, Oman
- Microeurydemus semivittatus (Jacoby, 1899) – Somalia, Saudi Arabia, Yemen
- Microeurydemus unimaculatus Pic, 1938 – Gabon
- Microeurydemus wraniki Lopatin in Lopatin & Konstantinov, 1994 – Yemen

Species moved to Microsyagrus:

- Microeurydemus bingeri Pic, 1949
- Microeurydemus gabonicus Pic, 1949
- Microeurydemus immaculatus Pic, 1949

Species moved to Pathius:

- Microeurydemus pallidus Pic, 1952: renamed to Pathius pici Zoia, 2019

Species moved to Phascus:

- Microeurydemus instriatus Pic, 1949
