= Microsyagrus zeae =

Scientific classification
- Kingdom: Animalia
- Phylum: Arthropoda
- Clade: Pancrustacea
- Class: Insecta
- Order: Coleoptera
- Suborder: Polyphaga
- Infraorder: Cucujiformia
- Family: Chrysomelidae
- Genus: Microsyagrus
- Species: M. zeae

Binomial name
- Microsyagrus zeae (Bryant, 1948)

Synonyms
- Liniscus zeae Bryant, 1948

Species of beetle

Microsyagrus zeae is a species of leaf beetle of Senegal, described by Gilbert Ernest Bryant in 1948.
