= Anauxesis =

Scientific classification
- Domain: Eukaryota
- Kingdom: Animalia
- Phylum: Arthropoda
- Class: Insecta
- Order: Coleoptera
- Suborder: Polyphaga
- Infraorder: Cucujiformia
- Family: Cerambycidae
- Tribe: Agapanthiini
- Genus: Anauxesis

Genus of beetles

Anauxesis is a genus of beetles in the family Cerambycidae, containing the following species:

- Anauxesis albicans Breuning, 1938
- Anauxesis alboscutellaris Breuning, 1938
- Anauxesis andreaei Breuning, 1955
- Anauxesis atrata (Chevrolat, 1855)
- Anauxesis calabarica (Chevrolat, 1855)
- Anauxesis cincticornis (Pascoe, 1857)
- Anauxesis congoensis Breuning, 1938
- Anauxesis densepunctata Breuning, 1954
- Anauxesis elongata (Brancsik, 1897)
- Anauxesis elongatoides Breuning, 1949
- Anauxesis flavofemorata Lepesme & Breuning, 1952
- Anauxesis kenyensis Breuning, 1938
- Anauxesis kolbei Hintz, 1919
- Anauxesis laterirufa Breuning, 1981
- Anauxesis nigroantennalis Breuning, 1955
- Anauxesis perrieri Fairmaire, 1902
- Anauxesis proxima Breuning, 1938
- Anauxesis rufa Breuning, 1948
- Anauxesis rufipennis Breuning, 1976
- Anauxesis rufoscapa Breuning, 1950
- Anauxesis simplex Jordan, 1904
- Anauxesis singularis Aurivillius, 1908
- Anauxesis vicina Breuning, 1938
