= Microsyagrus rosae =

Scientific classification
- Kingdom: Animalia
- Phylum: Arthropoda
- Clade: Pancrustacea
- Class: Insecta
- Order: Coleoptera
- Suborder: Polyphaga
- Infraorder: Cucujiformia
- Family: Chrysomelidae
- Genus: Microsyagrus
- Species: M. rosae

Binomial name
- Microsyagrus rosae (Bryant, 1936)

Synonyms
- Syagrus rosae Bryant, 1936

Species of beetle

Microsyagrus rosae is a species of leaf beetle of Uganda and the Democratic Republic of the Congo. It was first described by Gilbert Ernest Bryant in 1936.
