= Afroneta millidgei =

Scientific classification
- Kingdom: Animalia
- Phylum: Arthropoda
- Subphylum: Chelicerata
- Class: Arachnida
- Order: Araneae
- Infraorder: Araneomorphae
- Family: Linyphiidae
- Genus: Afroneta
- Species: A. millidgei

Binomial name
- Afroneta millidgei Merrett & Russell-Smith, 1996

Species of spider

Afroneta millidgei is a species of sheet weaver found in Ethiopia. It was described by Merrett & Russell-Smith in 1996.
