= Eryxia =

Scientific classification
- Kingdom: Animalia
- Phylum: Arthropoda
- Clade: Pancrustacea
- Class: Insecta
- Order: Coleoptera
- Suborder: Polyphaga
- Infraorder: Cucujiformia
- Family: Chrysomelidae
- Subfamily: Eumolpinae
- Tribe: Bromiini
- Genus: Eryxia; Baly, 1865

Type species
- Eryxia baikiei Baly, 1865

Genus of leaf beetles from Africa and Asia

Eryxia is a genus of leaf beetles in the subfamily Eumolpinae. It is distributed in Africa and Western Asia.

== Species ==
Subgenus Eryxia Baly, 1865:

- Eryxia annobioides Escalera, 1914 – Morocco
- Eryxia baikiei Baly, 1865 – Mali, Senegal
- Eryxia cinerascens (Fairmaire, 1894) – Senegal
- Eryxia confusa Selman, 1972 – Congo, DR Congo
- Eryxia dentipes Pic, 1940 – Angola
- Eryxia gracilipes Lefèvre, 1890 – Yemen
- Eryxia holosericea (Klug, 1835) – DR Congo, Yemen, Mali, Senegal, Gabon, Congo, Ivory Coast
- Eryxia lineaticollis Pic, 1938
- Eryxia major Burgeon, 1941 – DR Congo
- Eryxia ritchiei Bryant, 1933 – Tanzania, Sudan
- Eryxia subtessellata Pic, 1938

Subgenus Azerberyxia Romantsov & Moseyko, 2020

- Eryxia serratotibialis Romantsov & Moseyko, 2020 – Azerbaijan

Species moved to Colasposoma:

- Eryxia coracina Lopatin, 1996
- Eryxia grandis Lefèvre, 1890
- Eryxia socotrana Gahan, 1903

Species moved to Melindea:

- Eryxia virescens Lefèvre, 1885
