= Syagrus morio =

Scientific classification
- Kingdom: Animalia
- Phylum: Arthropoda
- Clade: Pancrustacea
- Class: Insecta
- Order: Coleoptera
- Suborder: Polyphaga
- Infraorder: Cucujiformia
- Family: Chrysomelidae
- Genus: Syagrus
- Species: S. morio

Binomial name
- Syagrus morio Harold, 1877

Synonyms
- Syagrus puncticollis Lefèvre, 1877

Species of beetle

Syagrus morio is a species of leaf beetle distributed from eastern to central and southern Africa. It was first described from Port Natal by Edgar von Harold in 1877.

== Distribution ==
Syagrus morio is recorded from Ethiopia, DR Congo, Uganda, Kenya, Rwanda, Tanzania, Malawi, Mozambique, Botswana, and South Africa.
