= Afroeurydemus holubi =

Scientific classification
- Kingdom: Animalia
- Phylum: Arthropoda
- Clade: Pancrustacea
- Class: Insecta
- Order: Coleoptera
- Suborder: Polyphaga
- Infraorder: Cucujiformia
- Family: Chrysomelidae
- Genus: Afroeurydemus
- Species: A. holubi

Binomial name
- Afroeurydemus holubi (Jacoby, 1897)

Synonyms
- Eurydemus holubi Jacoby, 1897

Species of beetle

Afroeurydemus holubi is a species of leaf beetle of the Democratic Republic of the Congo, described by Martin Jacoby in 1897.
