= Syagrus perpuncticollis =

Scientific classification
- Kingdom: Animalia
- Phylum: Arthropoda
- Clade: Pancrustacea
- Class: Insecta
- Order: Coleoptera
- Suborder: Polyphaga
- Infraorder: Cucujiformia
- Family: Chrysomelidae
- Genus: Syagrus
- Species: S. perpuncticollis

Binomial name
- Syagrus perpuncticollis (Burgeon, 1940)

Synonyms
- Liniscus perpuncticollis Burgeon, 1940

Species of beetle

Syagrus perpuncticollis is a species of leaf beetle from the Democratic Republic of the Congo, described by Louis Burgeon in 1940.
