= Microeurydemus flavescens =

Scientific classification
- Kingdom: Animalia
- Phylum: Arthropoda
- Clade: Pancrustacea
- Class: Insecta
- Order: Coleoptera
- Suborder: Polyphaga
- Infraorder: Cucujiformia
- Family: Chrysomelidae
- Genus: Microeurydemus
- Species: M. flavescens

Binomial name
- Microeurydemus flavescens (Bryant, 1942)

Synonyms
- Syagrus flavescens Bryant, 1942

Species of beetle

Microeurydemus flavescens is a species of leaf beetle of Saudi Arabia and Oman, first described by Gilbert Ernest Bryant in 1942.
