= Afroeurydemus guessfeldi =

Scientific classification
- Kingdom: Animalia
- Phylum: Arthropoda
- Clade: Pancrustacea
- Class: Insecta
- Order: Coleoptera
- Suborder: Polyphaga
- Infraorder: Cucujiformia
- Family: Chrysomelidae
- Genus: Afroeurydemus
- Species: A. guessfeldi

Binomial name
- Afroeurydemus guessfeldi (Karsch, 1882)

Synonyms
- Eurydemus guessfeldi Karsch, 1882

Species of beetle

Afroeurydemus guessfeldi is a species of leaf beetle of West Africa, the Republic of the Congo and the Democratic Republic of the Congo, described by Ferdinand Karsch in 1882.
