= Abacetus basilewskyi =

Scientific classification
- Kingdom: Animalia
- Phylum: Arthropoda
- Class: Insecta
- Order: Coleoptera
- Suborder: Adephaga
- Family: Carabidae
- Genus: Abacetus
- Species: A. basilewskyi

Binomial name
- Abacetus basilewskyi Straneo, 1948

Species of beetle

Abacetus basilewskyi is a species of ground beetle in the subfamily Pterostichinae. It was described by Straneo in 1948 and is an endemic species found in Mozambique.
