= Afroeurydemus signatus =

Scientific classification
- Kingdom: Animalia
- Phylum: Arthropoda
- Clade: Pancrustacea
- Class: Insecta
- Order: Coleoptera
- Suborder: Polyphaga
- Infraorder: Cucujiformia
- Family: Chrysomelidae
- Genus: Afroeurydemus
- Species: A. signatus

Binomial name
- Afroeurydemus signatus (Pic, 1940)

Synonyms
- Syagrus signatus Pic, 1940

Species of beetle

Afroeurydemus signatus is a species of leaf beetle of Angola, described by Maurice Pic in 1940.
