= Afroneta basilewskyi =

Scientific classification
- Kingdom: Animalia
- Phylum: Arthropoda
- Subphylum: Chelicerata
- Class: Arachnida
- Order: Araneae
- Infraorder: Araneomorphae
- Family: Linyphiidae
- Genus: Afroneta
- Species: A. basilewskyi

Binomial name
- Afroneta basilewskyi Holm, 1968

Species of spider

Afroneta basilewskyi is a species of sheet weaver found in Tanzania. It was described by Holm in 1968.
