= Afroeurydemus basilewskyi =

Scientific classification
- Kingdom: Animalia
- Phylum: Arthropoda
- Clade: Pancrustacea
- Class: Insecta
- Order: Coleoptera
- Suborder: Polyphaga
- Infraorder: Cucujiformia
- Family: Chrysomelidae
- Genus: Afroeurydemus
- Species: A. basilewskyi

Binomial name
- Afroeurydemus basilewskyi Selman, 1972

Species of beetle

Afroeurydemus basilewskyi is a species of leaf beetle reported from the Republic of the Congo and the Democratic Republic of the Congo. It was first described from Garamba National Park by Brian J. Selman in 1972.
