= Abacetus bredoi =

Scientific classification
- Kingdom: Animalia
- Phylum: Arthropoda
- Class: Insecta
- Order: Coleoptera
- Suborder: Adephaga
- Family: Carabidae
- Genus: Abacetus
- Species: A. bredoi

Binomial name
- Abacetus bredoi Burgeon, 1934

Species of beetle

Abacetus bredoi is a species of ground beetle in the subfamily Pterostichinae. It was described by Burgeon in 1934.
