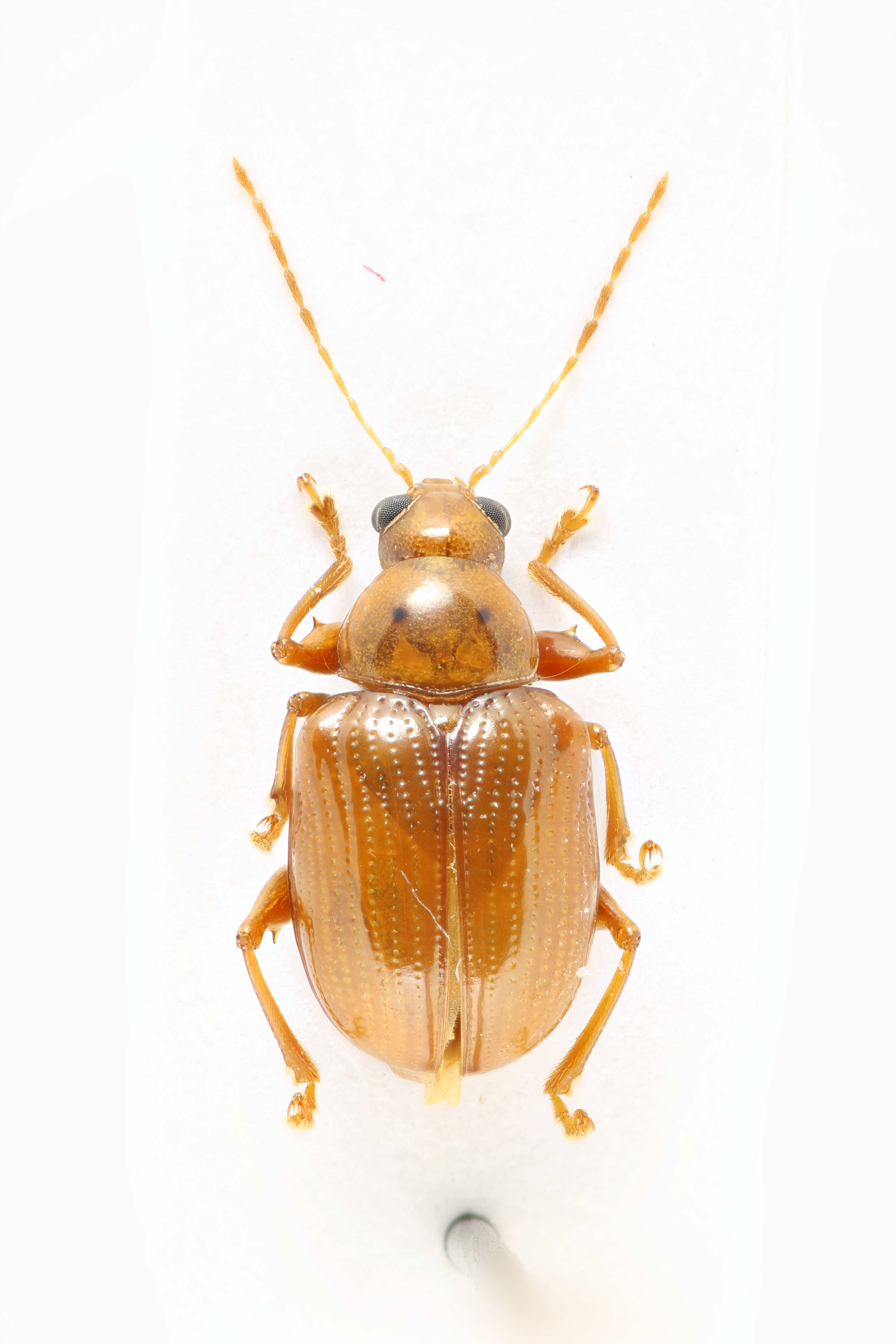
- Afroeurydemus sp.; Ivory Coast

Scientific classification
- Kingdom: Animalia
- Phylum: Arthropoda
- Clade: Pancrustacea
- Class: Insecta
- Order: Coleoptera
- Suborder: Polyphaga
- Infraorder: Cucujiformia
- Family: Chrysomelidae
- Subfamily: Eumolpinae
- Tribe: Typophorini
- Genus: Afroeurydemus; Selman, 1965

Type species
- Eurydemus geniculatus (= Eurydemus nubiensis Harold, 1877) Jacoby, 1904

= Afroeurydemus =

Genus of leaf beetles from Africa

Afroeurydemus is a genus of leaf beetles in the subfamily Eumolpinae, found in Africa. The genus was separated from Eurydemus in 1965 by Brian J. Selman, who moved all African species of Eurydemus he had seen to this genus or related African genera and considered it likely that Eurydemus was restricted to Fiji. Many species were also originally placed in Syagrus.

== Species ==
- Afroeurydemus adustus Zoia, 2019
  - Afroeurydemus adustus adustus Zoia, 2019
  - Afroeurydemus adustus tanzaniae Zoia, 2019
  - Afroeurydemus adustus zambesianus Zoia, 2019
- Afroeurydemus akaensis Selman, 1972
- Afroeurydemus alluaudi (Lefèvre, 1889)
- Afroeurydemus annulipes (Pic, 1952)
- Afroeurydemus apicicornis (Lefèvre, 1891)
- Afroeurydemus armatus (Achard, 1915)
- Afroeurydemus atricollis (Pic, 1940)
- Afroeurydemus atricolor (Pic, 1940)
- Afroeurydemus augusti Zoia, 2019
- Afroeurydemus basilewskyi Selman, 1972
- Afroeurydemus bimaculatus (Lefèvre, 1877)
- Afroeurydemus bipunctatus (Weise, 1883)
- Afroeurydemus bredoi (Burgeon, 1941)
- Afroeurydemus brevilineatus (Jacoby, 1900)
- Afroeurydemus brunneopunctatus (Pic, 1941)
- Afroeurydemus caliginosus (Lefèvre, 1891)
  - Afroeurydemus caliginosus caliginosus (Lefèvre, 1891)
  - Afroeurydemus caliginosus discalis (Burgeon, 1941)
- Afroeurydemus carinatus (Bryant, 1954)
- Afroeurydemus congoensis (Burgeon, 1942)
- Afroeurydemus conradsi (Pic, 1939)
- Afroeurydemus corrosicollis (Lefèvre, 1891)
- Afroeurydemus cribricollis (Pic, 1939)
- Afroeurydemus decellei Selman, 1973
- Afroeurydemus demoulini Selman, 1972
- Afroeurydemus distinctus Selman, 1972
- Afroeurydemus diversepunctatus (Pic, 1940)
- Afroeurydemus femoratus (Lefèvre, 1891)
- Afroeurydemus flavicans (Harold, 1877)
- Afroeurydemus fortesculptus Zoia, 2019
- Afroeurydemus garambaensis Selman, 1972
- Afroeurydemus ghesquierei (Burgeon, 1941)
- Afroeurydemus guessfeldi (Karsch, 1882)
- Afroeurydemus holasi (Pic, 1953)
- Afroeurydemus holubi (Jacoby, 1897)
- Afroeurydemus hopei (Bryant, 1938)
- Afroeurydemus ituriensis (Weise, 1924)
- Afroeurydemus luteoapicalis (Pic, 1939)
- Afroeurydemus maculipennis (Jacoby, 1900)
- Afroeurydemus maculosus (Harold, 1877)
- Afroeurydemus marginatus (Jacoby, 1900)
- Afroeurydemus michai Selman, 1972
- Afroeurydemus niger Selman, 1972
- Afroeurydemus nigriceps (Jacoby, 1904)
- Afroeurydemus nigricinctus Selman, 1972
- Afroeurydemus nigricornis Selman, 1972
- Afroeurydemus nigrolimbatus (Ritsema, 1874)
- Afroeurydemus nigrosignatus (Lefèvre, 1877)
- Afroeurydemus nigrostriatus (Jacoby, 1897)
- Afroeurydemus nodieri (Pic, 1941)
- Afroeurydemus nubiensis (Harold, 1877)
- Afroeurydemus obscurellus Selman, 1972
- Afroeurydemus pallidicolor (Pic, 1941)
- Afroeurydemus pallidus Selman, 1972
- Afroeurydemus parvomaculatus Zoia, 2019
- Afroeurydemus puncticollis (Bryant, 1933)
- Afroeurydemus quadrimaculatus (Jacoby, 1904)
- Afroeurydemus rufonitens (J. Thomson, 1858)
- Afroeurydemus rufulus (J. Thomson, 1858)
- Afroeurydemus saegeri Selman, 1972
- Afroeurydemus sansibaricus (Lefèvre, 1891)
- Afroeurydemus selmani Zoia, 2019
- Afroeurydemus semicostatus (Pic, 1940)
- Afroeurydemus sexnotatus (Lefèvre, 1891)
- Afroeurydemus signatus (Pic, 1940)
- Afroeurydemus striatipennis (Lefèvre, 1877)
- Afroeurydemus striatus Selman, 1972
- Afroeurydemus testaceicornis (Pic, 1941)
- Afroeurydemus uniformis Selman, 1972
- Afroeurydemus variicolor (Berlioz, 1919)
- Afroeurydemus verschureni Selman, 1972
- Afroeurydemus vrijdaghi (Burgeon, 1941)

Synonyms:

- Afroeurydemus jansoni (Baly, 1878): synonym of Afroeurydemus carinatus (Bryant, 1954) (priority?)
- Afroeurydemus signatus Selman, 1972: renamed to Afroeurydemus selmani Zoia, 2019
- Angoleumolpus grandis Pic, 1953: synonym of Afroeurydemus bipunctatus (Weise, 1883)
- Eurydemus geniculatus Jacoby, 1904: synonym of Afroeurydemus nubiensis (Harold, 1877)
- Microsyagrus cribricollis Pic, 1952: renamed to Afroeurydemus fortesculptus Zoia, 2019
- Syagrus quadrimaculatus Pic, 1940: renamed to Afroeurydemus parvomaculatus Zoia, 2019
