= Afroeurydemus bipunctatus =

Scientific classification
- Kingdom: Animalia
- Phylum: Arthropoda
- Clade: Pancrustacea
- Class: Insecta
- Order: Coleoptera
- Suborder: Polyphaga
- Infraorder: Cucujiformia
- Family: Chrysomelidae
- Genus: Afroeurydemus
- Species: A. bipunctatus

Binomial name
- Afroeurydemus bipunctatus (Weise, 1883)

Synonyms
- Angoleumolpus grandis Pic, 1953; Syagrus bipunctatus Weise, 1883

Species of beetle

Afroeurydemus bipunctatus is a species of leaf beetle of Ghana, Ivory Coast, the Republic of the Congo and the Democratic Republic of the Congo. It was first described by Julius Weise in 1883.
