= Afroeurydemus congoensis =

Scientific classification
- Kingdom: Animalia
- Phylum: Arthropoda
- Clade: Pancrustacea
- Class: Insecta
- Order: Coleoptera
- Suborder: Polyphaga
- Infraorder: Cucujiformia
- Family: Chrysomelidae
- Genus: Afroeurydemus
- Species: A. congoensis

Binomial name
- Afroeurydemus congoensis (Burgeon, 1942)

Synonyms
- Paraivongius congoensis (Burgeon, 1942); Rhembastus congoensis Burgeon, 1942

Species of beetle

Afroeurydemus congoensis is a species of leaf beetle of the Republic of the Congo and the Democratic Republic of the Congo. It was first described by the Belgian entomologist Louis Burgeon in 1942, from specimens collected by Gaston-François de Witte from the Albert National Park between 1933 and 1935, and was originally placed in the genus Rhembastus. It was then moved by Brian J. Selman to the genus Paraivongius in 1965. However, this was later determined to be a mistake, and the species was then moved to Afroeurydemus in 1970.
