= Eryxia holosericea =

Scientific classification
- Kingdom: Animalia
- Phylum: Arthropoda
- Clade: Pancrustacea
- Class: Insecta
- Order: Coleoptera
- Suborder: Polyphaga
- Infraorder: Cucujiformia
- Family: Chrysomelidae
- Genus: Eryxia
- Species: E. holosericea

Binomial name
- Eryxia holosericea (Klug, 1835)

Synonyms
- Eumolpus holosericeus Klug, 1835; Pachnephorus holosericeus Karsch, 1882

Species of beetle

Eryxia holosericea is a species of leaf beetle. It is distributed in the Democratic Republic of the Congo, Yemen, Mali, Senegal, Gabon, the Republic of the Congo and Ivory Coast. It was described by the German entomologist Johann Christoph Friedrich Klug in 1835.
