= Afroeurydemus ituriensis =

Scientific classification
- Kingdom: Animalia
- Phylum: Arthropoda
- Clade: Pancrustacea
- Class: Insecta
- Order: Coleoptera
- Suborder: Polyphaga
- Infraorder: Cucujiformia
- Family: Chrysomelidae
- Genus: Afroeurydemus
- Species: A. ituriensis

Binomial name
- Afroeurydemus ituriensis (Weise, 1924)

Synonyms
- Rhembastus ituriensis Weise, 1924

Species of beetle

Afroeurydemus ituriensis is a species of leaf beetle of the Democratic Republic of the Congo, described by Julius Weise in 1924.
