= Syagrus (beetle) =

Scientific classification
- Kingdom: Animalia
- Phylum: Arthropoda
- Clade: Pancrustacea
- Class: Insecta
- Order: Coleoptera
- Suborder: Polyphaga
- Infraorder: Cucujiformia
- Family: Chrysomelidae
- Subfamily: Eumolpinae
- Tribe: Typophorini
- Genus: Syagrus; Chapuis in Lacordaire, 1874

Type species
- Syagrus buqueti (= Cryptocephalus calcaratus Fabricius, 1775) Chapuis, 1874

Genus of leaf beetles from Africa

Syagrus is a genus of leaf beetles in the subfamily Eumolpinae. They are known from the mainland of Africa. They are often attracted by plants in the family Malvaceae; Syagrus rugifrons and Syagrus calcaratus are pests of cotton. The larvae of Syagrus calcaratus attack the roots of the plant and cause it to wilt.

Many species described from Madagascar were included in Syagrus by Jan Bechyně in the 1940s to 1960s. These species have been transferred to the related genus Pheloticus, restricting Syagrus to the mainland of Africa. Many additional species of Syagrus described from mainland Africa have been transferred to other African Eumolpinae genera such as Afroeurydemus, Microsyagrus and Proliniscus.

== Species ==
Species of Syagrus include the following:

- Syagrus bodongi Weise, 1905 – "Rhodesia"
- Syagrus calcaratus (Fabricius, 1775) – widely distributed across sub-Saharan Africa
- Syagrus concoloricornis Pic, 1940 – South Africa: Pretoria
- Syagrus fuscoaeneus Fairmaire, 1894 – "Senegal"
- Syagrus inhumeralis Pic, 1936 – Angola: "Osi"
- Syagrus interstitialis (Jacoby, 1904) – Angola, Zambia, Mozambique
- Syagrus morio Harold, 1877 – central, eastern and southern Africa
- Syagrus opacus Jacoby, 1900 – Angola, Zambia, Zimbabwe, South Africa
- Syagrus ortobiensis Selman, 1963 – Chad, South Sudan, Ethiopia, Somalia
- Syagrus perpuncticollis (Burgeon, 1940) – DR Congo
- Syagrus puncticollis (Harold, 1877) – Guinea, Sierra Leone, South Sudan, DR Congo, Malawi, Mozambique
- Syagrus rufipennis Pic, 1940 – Tanzania: "Windi"
- Syagrus rufobrunneus Lefèvre, 1890 – Zimbabwe, Mozambique, South Africa
- Syagrus rugiceps Lefèvre, 1890 – Somalia, Mozambique, South Africa
- Syagrus rugifrons Baly, 1878 – Tanzania, South Africa
- Syagrus sehranus Aslam, 1968 – Algeria: Adrar des Ifoghas
- Syagrus silfverbergi Selman, 1973 – South Sudan: Equatoria: Torit-Kapoeta
- Syagrus strigaticeps (Lefèvre, 1891) – "Afrique occidentale"
- Syagrus tristis Jacoby, 1904 – South Sudan, Congo, Mozambique, South Africa
