= Haplinis fluviatilis =

Conservation status
- Data Deficient (NZ TCS)

Scientific classification
- Domain: Eukaryota
- Kingdom: Animalia
- Phylum: Arthropoda
- Subphylum: Chelicerata
- Class: Arachnida
- Order: Araneae
- Infraorder: Araneomorphae
- Family: Linyphiidae
- Genus: Haplinis
- Species: H. fluviatilis

Binomial name
- Haplinis fluviatilis (Blest, 1979)

Synonyms
- Mynoglenes fluviatilis

Species of spider

Haplinis fluviatilis is a species of sheet weaver spider endemic to New Zealand.

== Taxonomy ==
This species was described as Mynoglenes fluviatilis in 1979 by A.D Blest from male and female specimens. The holotype is stored in Otago Museum.

== Description ==
The male is recorded at 6.08mm in length whereas the female is 6.33mm. The male has a brown cephalothorax and yellow brown legs. The abdomen is dark grey with pale markings. The female abdomen is similar but paler in colour.

== Distribution ==
This species is only known from the South Island of New Zealand.

== Conservation status ==
Under the New Zealand Threat Classification System, this species is listed as "Data Deficient" with the qualifiers of "Data Poor: Size" and "Data Poor: Trend".
