= Haplinis subclathrata =

Scientific classification
- Kingdom: Animalia
- Phylum: Arthropoda
- Subphylum: Chelicerata
- Class: Arachnida
- Order: Araneae
- Infraorder: Araneomorphae
- Family: Linyphiidae
- Genus: Haplinis
- Species: H. subclathrata

Binomial name
- Haplinis subclathrata Simon, 1894

Species of spider

Haplinis subclathrata is a species of spider of the family Linyphiidae. It was described by Eugène Simon in 1894 in his work Histoire naturelle des araignées.
