= Haplinis taranakii =

Conservation status
- Naturally Uncommon (NZ TCS)

Scientific classification
- Domain: Eukaryota
- Kingdom: Animalia
- Phylum: Arthropoda
- Subphylum: Chelicerata
- Class: Arachnida
- Order: Araneae
- Infraorder: Araneomorphae
- Family: Linyphiidae
- Genus: Haplinis
- Species: H. taranakii

Binomial name
- Haplinis taranakii (Blest, 1979)

Synonyms
- Pseudafroneta taranakii

Species of spider

Haplinis taranakii is a species of sheet weaver spider endemic to New Zealand.

== Taxonomy ==
This species was described as Pseudafroneta taranakii in 1979 by A.D Blest from female specimens. In 2002, it was moved to the Haplinis genus and the male was described. The holotype is stored in Otago Museum.

== Description ==
The male is recorded at 5.51mm in length whereas the female is 5mm.

== Distribution ==
This species is only known from Taranaki, New Zealand.

== Conservation status ==
Under the New Zealand Threat Classification System, this species is listed as "Naturally Uncommon" with the qualifier of "Range Restricted".
