= Haplinis contorta =

Conservation status
- Not Threatened (NZ TCS)

Scientific classification
- Domain: Eukaryota
- Kingdom: Animalia
- Phylum: Arthropoda
- Subphylum: Chelicerata
- Class: Arachnida
- Order: Araneae
- Infraorder: Araneomorphae
- Family: Linyphiidae
- Genus: Haplinis
- Species: H. contorta

Binomial name
- Haplinis contorta (Blest, 1979)

Synonyms
- Mynoglenes contorta

Species of spider

Haplinis contorta is a species of sheet weaver spider endemic to New Zealand.

== Taxonomy ==
This species was described as Mynoglenes contorta in 1979 by A.D Blest from a male specimen. It was most recently revised in 2002, in which the female was described. The holotype is stored in the New Zealand Arthropod Collection.

== Description ==
The female is recorded at 6.38mm in length.

== Distribution ==
This species is only known from Nelson, New Zealand.

== Conservation status ==
Under the New Zealand Threat Classification System, this species is listed as "Not Threatened".
