= Haplinis banksi =

Conservation status
- Naturally Uncommon (NZ TCS)

Scientific classification
- Kingdom: Animalia
- Phylum: Arthropoda
- Subphylum: Chelicerata
- Class: Arachnida
- Order: Araneae
- Infraorder: Araneomorphae
- Family: Linyphiidae
- Genus: Haplinis
- Species: H. banksi

Binomial name
- Haplinis banksi (Blest, 1979)

Synonyms
- Mynoglenes banksi

Species of spider

Haplinis banksi is a species of sheet weaver spider endemic to New Zealand.

== Taxonomy ==
This species was described as Mynoglenes banksi in 1979 by A.D Blest from male and female specimens. The holotype is stored in Otago Museum.

== Description ==
The male is recorded at 3.12mm in length whereas the female is 4.74mm. This species is a dusky brown colour. The abdomen has pale markings dorsally.

== Distribution ==
This species is only known from Banks Peninsula in New Zealand.

== Conservation status ==
Under the New Zealand Threat Classification System, this species is listed as "Naturally Uncommon" with the qualifier of "Range Restricted".
