= Haplinis inexacta =

Conservation status
- Not Threatened (NZ TCS)

Scientific classification
- Domain: Eukaryota
- Kingdom: Animalia
- Phylum: Arthropoda
- Subphylum: Chelicerata
- Class: Arachnida
- Order: Araneae
- Infraorder: Araneomorphae
- Family: Linyphiidae
- Genus: Haplinis
- Species: H. inexacta

Binomial name
- Haplinis inexacta (Blest, 1979)

Synonyms
- Mynoglenes inexacta

Species of spider

Haplinis inexacta is a species of sheet weaver spider endemic to New Zealand.

== Taxonomy ==
This species was described as Mynoglenes inexacta in 1979 by A.D Blest from male and female specimens. It was most recently revised in 2002, in which it was moved to the Haplinis genus. The holotype is stored in Otago Museum.

== Description ==
The male is recorded at 3.17mm in length whereas the female is 3.83mm.

== Distribution ==
This species is only known from the South Island of New Zealand.

== Conservation status ==
Under the New Zealand Threat Classification System, this species is listed as "Not Threatened".
