= Haplinis brevipes =

Conservation status
- Naturally Uncommon (NZ TCS)

Scientific classification
- Domain: Eukaryota
- Kingdom: Animalia
- Phylum: Arthropoda
- Subphylum: Chelicerata
- Class: Arachnida
- Order: Araneae
- Infraorder: Araneomorphae
- Family: Linyphiidae
- Genus: Haplinis
- Species: H. brevipes

Binomial name
- Haplinis brevipes (Blest, 1979)

Synonyms
- Mynoglenes brevipes

Species of spider

Haplinis brevipes is a species of sheet weaver spider endemic to New Zealand.

== Taxonomy ==
This species was described as Mynoglenes banksi in 1979 by A.D Blest from male and female specimens. The holotype is stored in the New Zealand Arthropod Collection under registration number NZAC03014972.

== Description ==
The male is recorded at 2.6mm in length whereas the female is 3.4mm. This species has a yellow brown cephalothorax and legs. The abdomen is also yellow brown with blackish markings dorsally.

== Distribution ==
This species is only known from the Chatham Islands in New Zealand.

== Conservation status ==
Under the New Zealand Threat Classification System, this species is listed as "Naturally Uncommon" with the qualifiers of "Island Endemic" and "Range Restricted".
