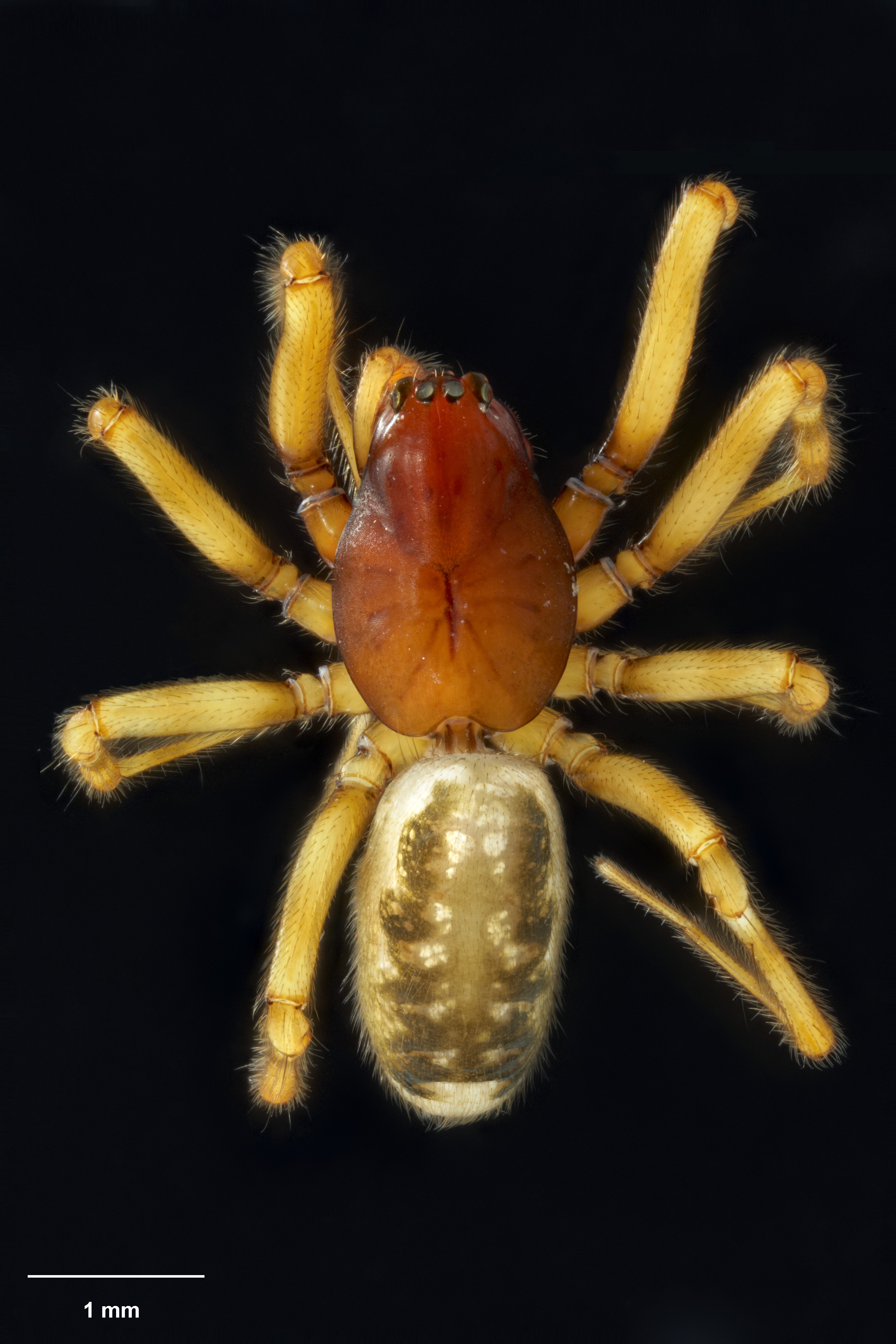

Conservation status
- Not Threatened (NZ TCS)

Scientific classification
- Domain: Eukaryota
- Kingdom: Animalia
- Phylum: Arthropoda
- Subphylum: Chelicerata
- Class: Arachnida
- Order: Araneae
- Infraorder: Araneomorphae
- Family: Linyphiidae
- Genus: Haplinis
- Species: H. subtilis

Binomial name
- Haplinis subtilis Blest & Vink, 2002

= Haplinis subtilis =

Species of spider

Haplinis subtilis is a species of sheet weaver spider endemic to New Zealand.

== Taxonomy ==
This species was described in 2002 by A.D Blest and Cor Vink from male and female specimens. The holotype is stored in Te Papa Museum under registration number AS.000653.

== Description ==
The male is recorded at 4.25mm in length whereas the female is 4.5mm. This species has a dark brown prosoma, brown legs and a dark grey abdomen that has white markings dorsally.

== Distribution ==
This species is known from scattered localities throughout New Zealand.

== Conservation status ==
Under the New Zealand Threat Classification System, this species is listed as "Not Threatened".
