= Haplinis dunstani =

Conservation status
- Data Deficient (NZ TCS)

Scientific classification
- Domain: Eukaryota
- Kingdom: Animalia
- Phylum: Arthropoda
- Subphylum: Chelicerata
- Class: Arachnida
- Order: Araneae
- Infraorder: Araneomorphae
- Family: Linyphiidae
- Genus: Haplinis
- Species: H. dunstani

Binomial name
- Haplinis dunstani (Blest, 1979)

Synonyms
- Mynoglenes dunstani

Species of spider

Haplinis dunstani is a species of sheet weaver spider endemic to New Zealand.

== Taxonomy ==
This species was described as Mynoglenes dunstani in 1979 by A.D Blest from female specimens. The holotype is stored in Otago Museum.

== Description ==
The female is recorded at 3.4mm in length. The cephalothorax and legs are dusky yellow. The abdomen is uniform dark grey.

== Distribution ==
This species is only known from central Otago, New Zealand.

== Conservation status ==
Under the New Zealand Threat Classification System, this species is listed as "Data Deficient" with the qualifiers of "Data Poor: Size", "Data Poor: Trend" and "One Location".
