= Haplinis horningi =

Conservation status
- Naturally Uncommon (NZ TCS)

Scientific classification
- Domain: Eukaryota
- Kingdom: Animalia
- Phylum: Arthropoda
- Subphylum: Chelicerata
- Class: Arachnida
- Order: Araneae
- Infraorder: Araneomorphae
- Family: Linyphiidae
- Genus: Haplinis
- Species: H. horningi

Binomial name
- Haplinis horningi (Blest, 1979)

Synonyms
- Mynoglenes horningi

Species of spider

Haplinis horningi is a species of sheet weaver spider endemic to New Zealand.

== Taxonomy ==
This species was described as Mynoglenes fluviatilis in 1979 by A.D Blest from male and female specimens. It was most recently revised in 2002, in which it was moved to the Haplinis genus. The holotype is stored in the New Zealand Arthropod Collection.

== Description ==
The male is recorded at 7.08mm in length whereas the female is 7.83mm. The male has a chestnut brown cephalothorax and legs. The abdomen is greyish yellow with pale markings dorsally. The female abdomen differs by being dark grey.

== Distribution ==
This species is only known from the Auckland Islands and the Antipodes in New Zealand.

== Conservation status ==
Under the New Zealand Threat Classification System, this species is listed as "Naturally Uncommon" with the qualifier of "Range Restricted".
