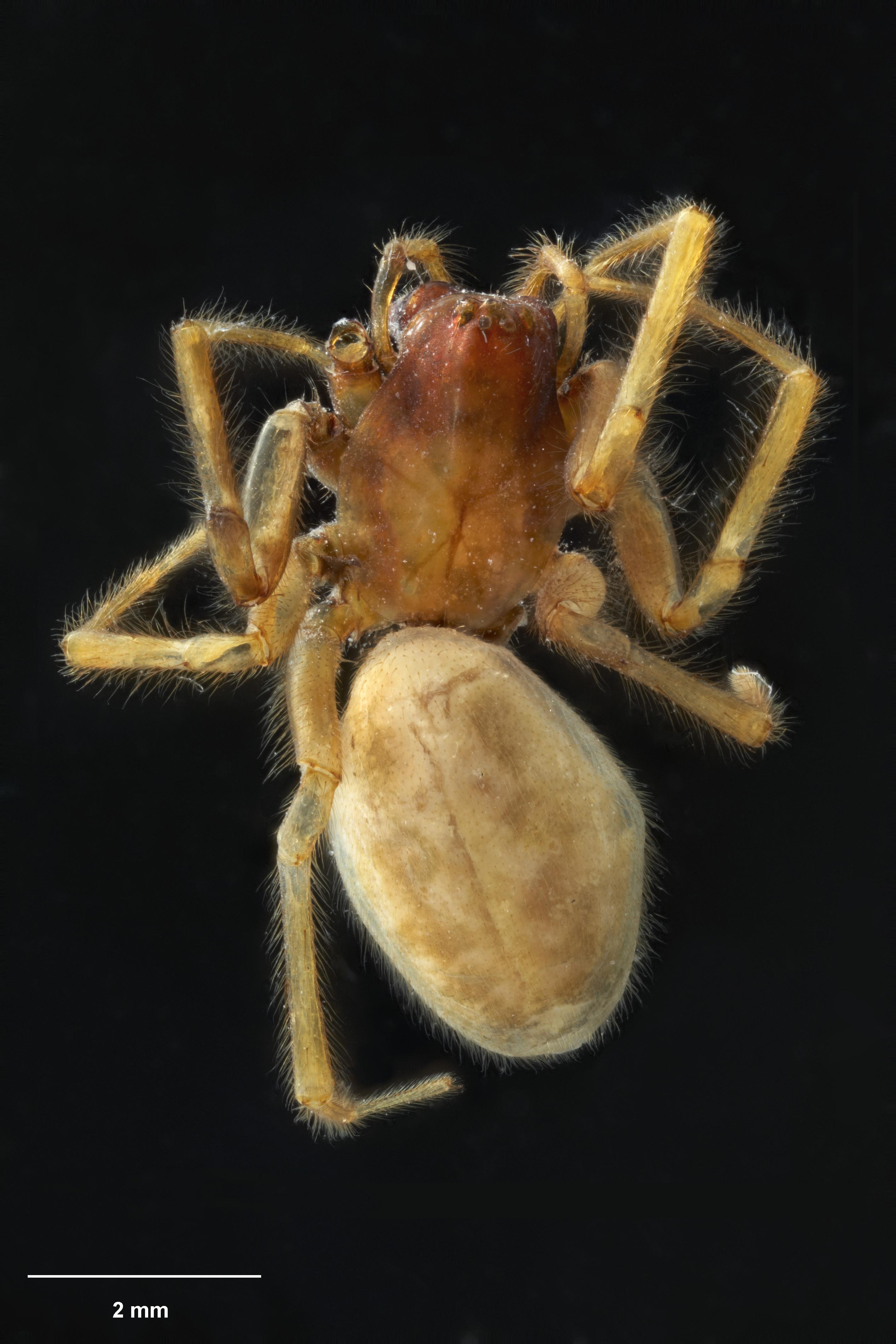

Conservation status
- Naturally Uncommon (NZ TCS)

Scientific classification
- Domain: Eukaryota
- Kingdom: Animalia
- Phylum: Arthropoda
- Subphylum: Chelicerata
- Class: Arachnida
- Order: Araneae
- Infraorder: Araneomorphae
- Family: Linyphiidae
- Genus: Haplinis
- Species: H. marplesi

Binomial name
- Haplinis marplesi Blest & Vink, 2003

= Haplinis marplesi =

Species of spider

Haplinis marplesi is a species of sheet weaver spider endemic to New Zealand.

== Taxonomy ==
This species was described in 2003 by A.D Blest and Cor Vink from a female specimen. The holotype is stored in Te Papa Museum under registration number AS.000615.

== Description ==
The female is recorded at 6.85mm in length. This species has a dark brown cephalothorax, brown legs and a uniform brownish grey abdomen.

== Distribution ==
This species is only known from Otago, New Zealand. It has only been found under logs in a salt marsh.

== Conservation status ==
Under the New Zealand Threat Classification System, this species is listed as "Naturally Uncommon" with the qualifiers of "Climate Impact" and "One Location"
