= Haplinis major =

Conservation status
- Not Threatened (NZ TCS)

Scientific classification
- Domain: Eukaryota
- Kingdom: Animalia
- Phylum: Arthropoda
- Subphylum: Chelicerata
- Class: Arachnida
- Order: Araneae
- Infraorder: Araneomorphae
- Family: Linyphiidae
- Genus: Haplinis
- Species: H. major

Binomial name
- Haplinis major (Blest, 1979)

Synonyms
- Mynoglenes major

Species of spider

Haplinis major is a species of sheet weaver spider endemic to New Zealand.

== Taxonomy ==
This species was described as Mynoglenes major in 1979 by A.D Blest from male and female specimens. In 2002, it was moved to the Haplinis genus. The holotype is stored in Otago Museum.

== Description ==
The male is recorded at 5.59mm in length whereas the female is 6.17mm. This species has a brown cephalothorax and legs. The abdomen is grey with pale markings dorsally.

== Distribution ==
This species is only known from the South Island of New Zealand.

== Conservation status ==
Under the New Zealand Threat Classification System, this species is listed as "Not Threatened".
