= Haplinis chiltoni =

Conservation status
- Data Deficient (NZ TCS)

Scientific classification
- Domain: Eukaryota
- Kingdom: Animalia
- Phylum: Arthropoda
- Subphylum: Chelicerata
- Class: Arachnida
- Order: Araneae
- Infraorder: Araneomorphae
- Family: Linyphiidae
- Genus: Haplinis
- Species: H. chiltoni

Binomial name
- Haplinis chiltoni (Hogg, 1911)

Synonyms
- Mynoglenes chiltoni

Species of spider

Haplinis chiltoni is a species of sheet weaver spider endemic to New Zealand.

== Taxonomy ==
This species was described as Mynoglenes chiltoni in 1911 by Henry Roughton Hogg from male and female specimens. The holotype is stored in the British Natural History Museum.

== Description ==
The male is recorded at 7mm in length whereas the female is 4mm.

== Distribution ==
This species is only known from scattered localities in New Zealand.

== Conservation status ==
Under the New Zealand Threat Classification System, this species is listed as "Data Deficient" with the qualifiers of "Data Poor: Size", "Data Poor: Trend" and "One Location".
