= Haplinis redacta =

Conservation status
- Naturally Uncommon (NZ TCS)

Scientific classification
- Domain: Eukaryota
- Kingdom: Animalia
- Phylum: Arthropoda
- Subphylum: Chelicerata
- Class: Arachnida
- Order: Araneae
- Infraorder: Araneomorphae
- Family: Linyphiidae
- Genus: Haplinis
- Species: H. redacta

Binomial name
- Haplinis redacta (Blest, 1979)

Synonyms
- Mynoglenes redacta

Species of spider

Haplinis redacta is a species of sheet weaver spider endemic to New Zealand.

== Taxonomy ==
This species was described as Mynoglenes redacta in 1979 by A.D Blest from male and female specimens.

== Description ==
The male is recorded at 5.99mm in length whereas the female is 6mm. The male has a pale yellow cephalothorax and legs. The abdomen is darkly coloured with lateral white spots. The female is similar but the carapace and legs are chestnut brown.

== Distribution ==
This species is only known from Snares Island and the Auckland Islands in New Zealand.

== Conservation status ==
Under the New Zealand Threat Classification System, this species is listed as "Naturally Uncommon" with the qualifiers of "Range Restricted".
