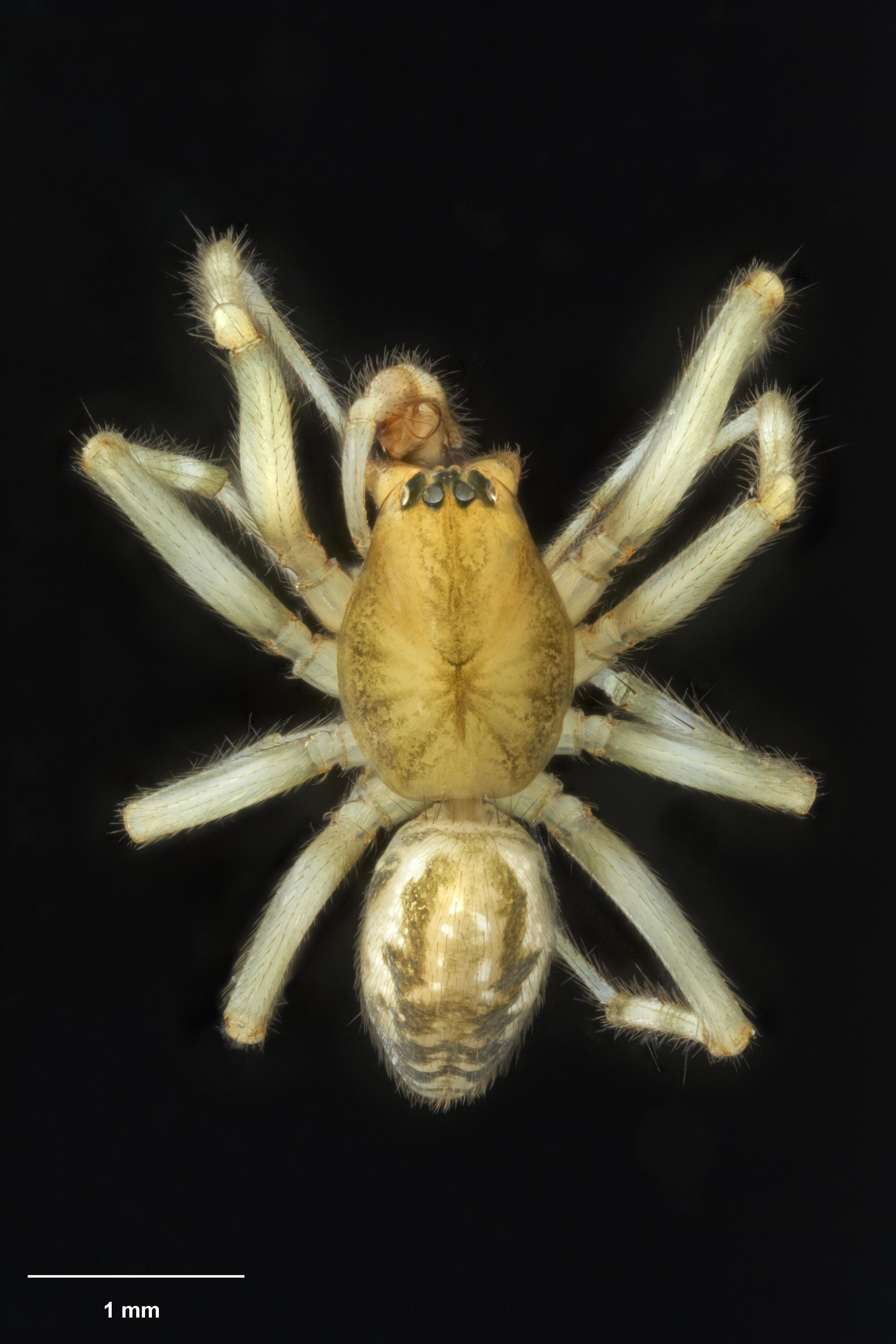

Conservation status
- Data Deficient (NZ TCS)

Scientific classification
- Domain: Eukaryota
- Kingdom: Animalia
- Phylum: Arthropoda
- Subphylum: Chelicerata
- Class: Arachnida
- Order: Araneae
- Infraorder: Araneomorphae
- Family: Linyphiidae
- Genus: Haplinis
- Species: H. abbreviata

Binomial name
- Haplinis abbreviata Blest & Vink, 2003

= Haplinis anomala =

Species of spider

Haplinis anomala is a species of sheet weaver spider endemic to New Zealand.

== Taxonomy ==
This species was described in 2003 by A.D Blest and Cor Vink from male and female specimens. The holotype is stored in Te Papa Museum under registration number AS.000632.

== Description ==
The male is recorded at 2.8mm in length whereas the female is 2.95mm. This species has an olive brown prosoma with darker stripes. The legs are pale greyish brown. The abdomen is grey to black with pale markings.

== Distribution ==
This species is only known from Nelson in the South Island, New Zealand.

== Conservation status ==
Under the New Zealand Threat Classification System, this species is listed as "Data Deficient" with the qualifiers of "Data Poor: Size", "Data Poor: Trend" and "One Location".
