= Haplinis mundenia =

Conservation status
- Not Threatened (NZ TCS)

Scientific classification
- Kingdom: Animalia
- Phylum: Arthropoda
- Subphylum: Chelicerata
- Class: Arachnida
- Order: Araneae
- Infraorder: Araneomorphae
- Family: Linyphiidae
- Genus: Haplinis
- Species: H. mundenia

Binomial name
- Haplinis mundenia (Urquhart, 1894)

Synonyms
- Linyphia mundenia; Paralinyphia mundenia; Mynoglenes mundenia

Species of spider

Haplinis mundenia is a species of sheet weaver spider endemic to New Zealand.

== Taxonomy ==
This species was described as Linyphia mundenia in 1894 by Arthur Urquhart from a single male specimen. It has received numerous revisions. The holotype is stored in Canterbury Museum.

== Description ==
The male is recorded at 4.75mm in length whereas the female is 6.09mm. This species has a yellow brown cephalothorax and legs. The abdomen is grey with dark lateral stripes.

== Distribution ==
This species is only known from the South Island of New Zealand.

== Conservation status ==
Under the New Zealand Threat Classification System, this species is listed as "Not Threatened".
