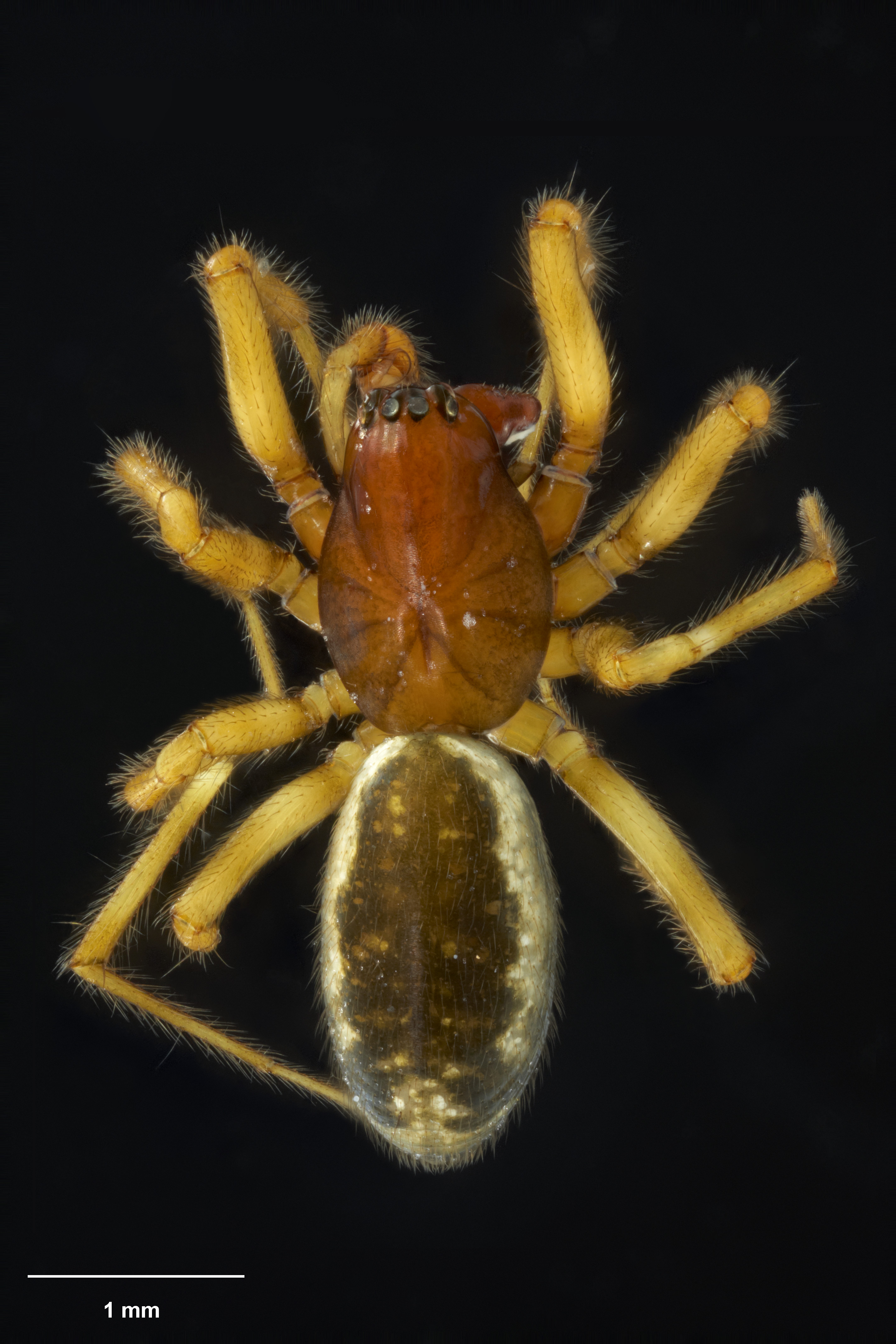

Conservation status
- Naturally Uncommon (NZ TCS)

Scientific classification
- Domain: Eukaryota
- Kingdom: Animalia
- Phylum: Arthropoda
- Subphylum: Chelicerata
- Class: Arachnida
- Order: Araneae
- Infraorder: Araneomorphae
- Family: Linyphiidae
- Genus: Haplinis
- Species: H. morainicola

Binomial name
- Haplinis morainicola Blest & Vink, 2002

= Haplinis morainicola =

Species of spider

Haplinis morainicola is a species of sheet weaver spider endemic to New Zealand.

== Taxonomy ==
This species was described in 2002 by A.D Blest and Cor Vink from male and female specimens. The holotype is stored in Te Papa Museum under registration number AS.000697.

== Description ==
The male is recorded at 3.38mm in length whereas the female is 3.5mm. The male has a dark brown cephalothorax, pale brown legs and an abdomen that is almost black with white lateral stripes. The female has similar colours, but the white markings are less distinct.

== Distribution ==
This species is only known from Westland, New Zealand.

== Conservation status ==
Under the New Zealand Threat Classification System, this species is listed as "Naturally Uncommon" with the qualifier of "Range Restricted".
