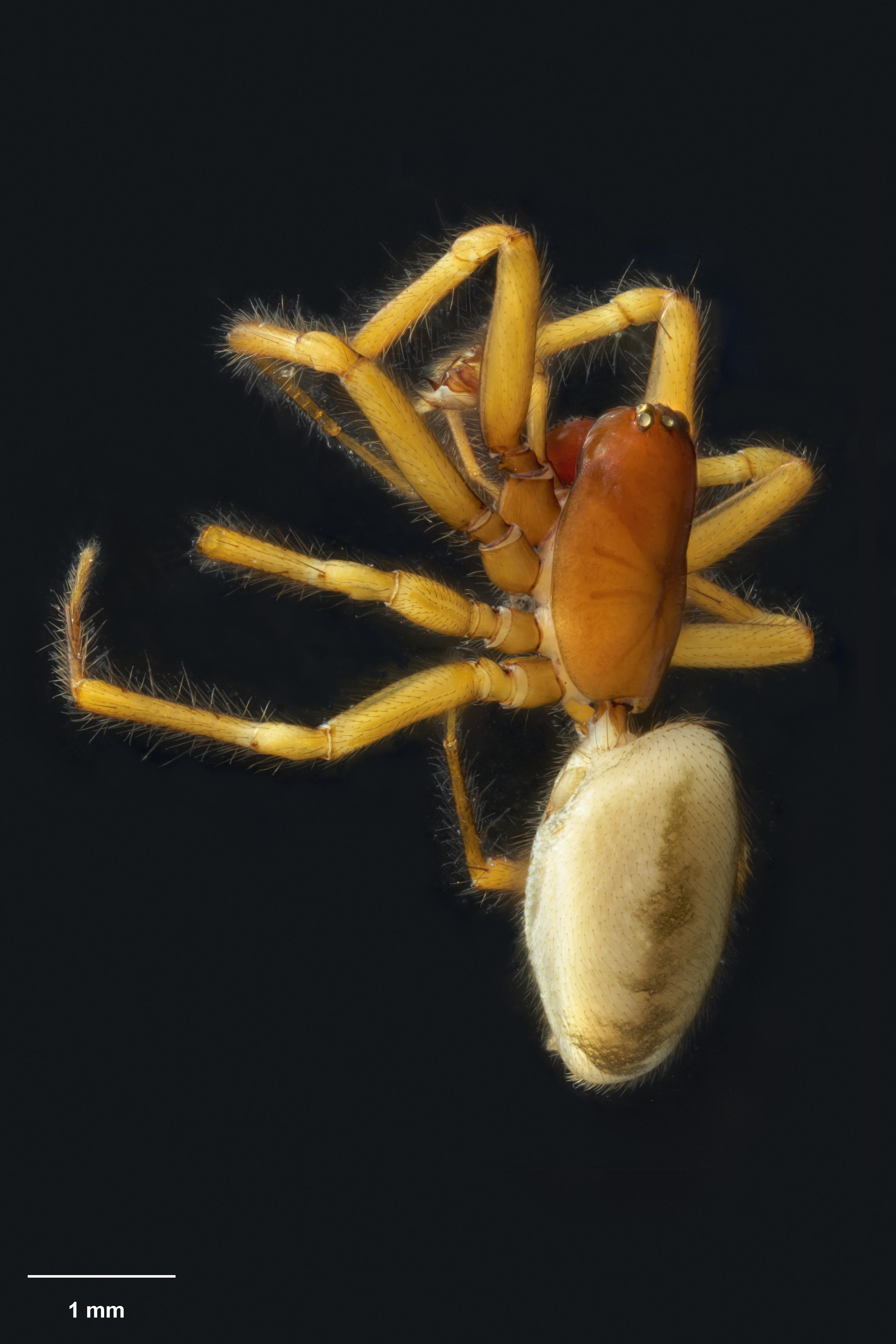

Conservation status
- Naturally Uncommon (NZ TCS)

Scientific classification
- Domain: Eukaryota
- Kingdom: Animalia
- Phylum: Arthropoda
- Subphylum: Chelicerata
- Class: Arachnida
- Order: Araneae
- Infraorder: Araneomorphae
- Family: Linyphiidae
- Genus: Haplinis
- Species: H. antipodiana

Binomial name
- Haplinis antipodiana Blest & Vink, 2002

= Haplinis antipodiana =

Species of spider

Haplinis antipodiana is a species of sheet weaver spider endemic to New Zealand.

== Taxonomy ==
This species was described in 2003 by A.D Blest and Cor Vink from male and female specimens. The holotype is stored Te Papa Museum under registration number AS.000640.

== Description ==
The male is recorded at 4.57mm in length whereas the female is 5.00mm. This species has a dark brown prosoma, pale brown legs and a pale brown abdomen with lateral grey stripes.

== Distribution ==
This species is only known from Antipodes Island in New Zealand.

== Conservation status ==
Under the New Zealand Threat Classification System, this species is listed as "Naturally Uncommon" with the qualifiers of "Island Endemic" and "One Location".
