= Haplinis similis =

Conservation status
- Naturally Uncommon (NZ TCS)

Scientific classification
- Domain: Eukaryota
- Kingdom: Animalia
- Phylum: Arthropoda
- Subphylum: Chelicerata
- Class: Arachnida
- Order: Araneae
- Infraorder: Araneomorphae
- Family: Linyphiidae
- Genus: Haplinis
- Species: H. similis

Binomial name
- Haplinis similis (Blest, 1979)

Synonyms
- Mynoglenes similis

Species of spider

Haplinis similis is a species of sheet weaver spider endemic to New Zealand.

== Taxonomy ==
This species was described as Mynoglenes silvicola in 1979 by A.D Blest from male and female specimens. In 2002, it was moved to the Haplinis genus. The holotype is stored in Otago Museum.

== Description ==
The male is recorded at 3.04mm in length whereas the female is 4mm. This species has a yellow brown cephalothorax and legs. The abdomen is grey.

== Distribution ==
This species is only known from Canterbury and Westland in New Zealand.

== Conservation status ==
Under the New Zealand Threat Classification System, this species is listed as "Naturally Uncommon" with the qualifier of "Range Restricted".
