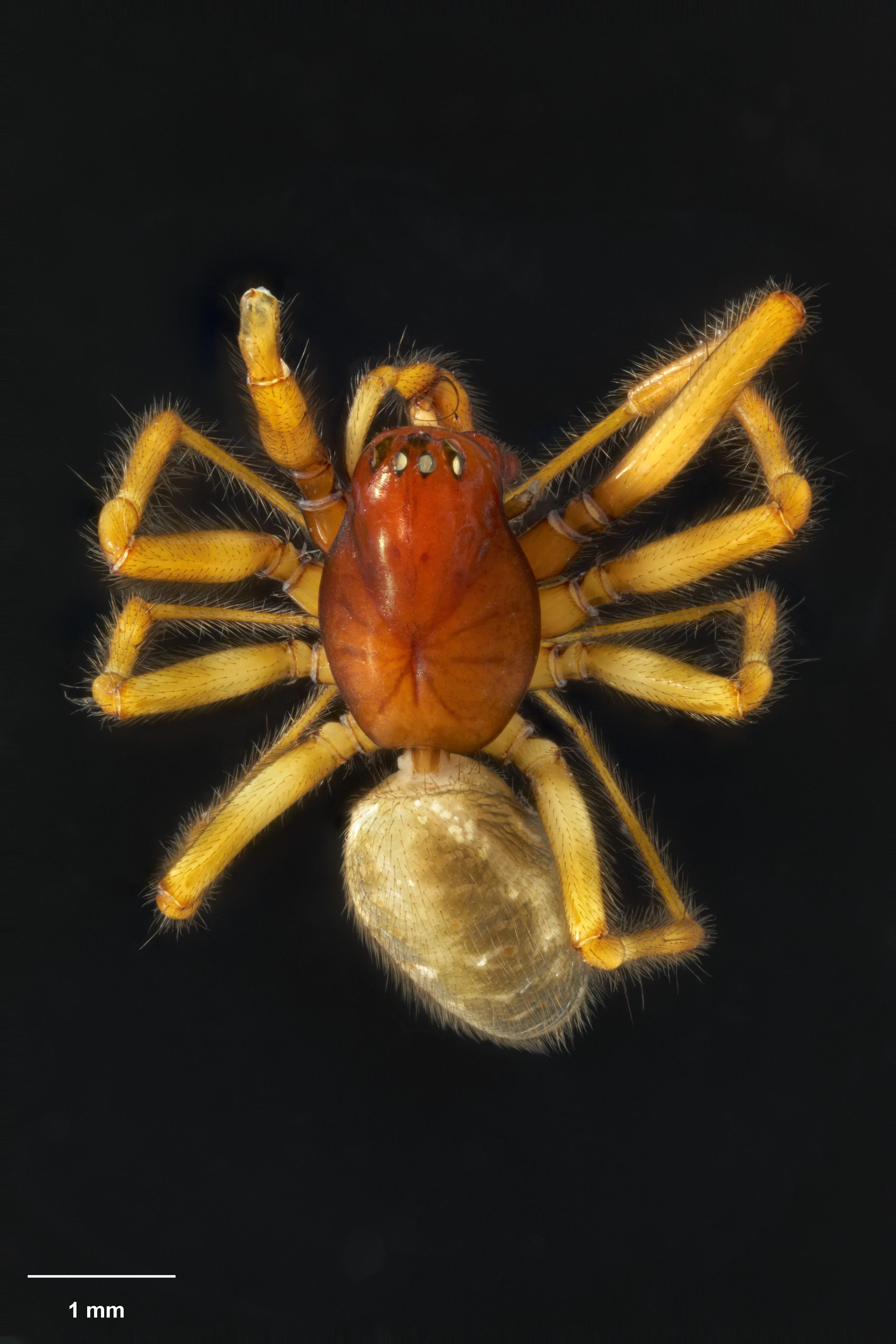

Conservation status
- Naturally Uncommon (NZ TCS)

Scientific classification
- Domain: Eukaryota
- Kingdom: Animalia
- Phylum: Arthropoda
- Subphylum: Chelicerata
- Class: Arachnida
- Order: Araneae
- Infraorder: Araneomorphae
- Family: Linyphiidae
- Genus: Haplinis
- Species: H. wairarapa

Binomial name
- Haplinis wairarapa Blest & Vink, 2002

= Haplinis wairarapa =

Species of spider

Haplinis wairarapa is a species of sheet weaver spider endemic to New Zealand.

== Taxonomy ==
This species was described in 2002 by A.D Blest and Cor Vink from male and female specimens. The holotype is stored in Te Papa Museum under registration number AS000819.

== Description ==
The male is recorded at 5mm in length whereas the female is 6.25mm. This species has a dark brown prosoma. The abdomen is black with white markings dorsally.

== Distribution ==
This species is only known from the Wairarapa region of New Zealand.

== Conservation status ==
Under the New Zealand Threat Classification System, this species is listed as "Naturally Uncommon" with the qualifier of "Range Restricted".
