= Haplinis innotabilis =

Conservation status
- Data Deficient (NZ TCS)

Scientific classification
- Domain: Eukaryota
- Kingdom: Animalia
- Phylum: Arthropoda
- Subphylum: Chelicerata
- Class: Arachnida
- Order: Araneae
- Infraorder: Araneomorphae
- Family: Linyphiidae
- Genus: Haplinis
- Species: H. innotabilis

Binomial name
- Haplinis innotabilis (Blest, 1979)

Synonyms
- Mynoglenes innotabilis

Species of spider

Haplinis innotabilis is a species of sheet weaver spider endemic to New Zealand.

== Taxonomy ==
This species was described as Mynoglenes innotabilis in 1979 by A.D Blest from male and female specimens.

== Description ==
The male is recorded at 2.12mm in length whereas the female is 2.8mm.

== Distribution ==
This species is only known from Dunedin, New Zealand.

== Conservation status ==
Under the New Zealand Threat Classification System, this species is listed as "Data Deficient" with the qualifiers of "Data Poor: Size" and "Data Poor: Trend".
