= Haplinis rupicola =

Conservation status
- Not Threatened (NZ TCS)

Scientific classification
- Domain: Eukaryota
- Kingdom: Animalia
- Phylum: Arthropoda
- Subphylum: Chelicerata
- Class: Arachnida
- Order: Araneae
- Infraorder: Araneomorphae
- Family: Linyphiidae
- Genus: Haplinis
- Species: H. rupicola

Binomial name
- Haplinis rupicola (Blest, 1979)

Synonyms
- Mynoglenes rupicola

Species of spider

Haplinis rupicola is a species of sheet weaver spider endemic to New Zealand.

== Taxonomy ==
This species was described as Mynoglenes rupicola in 1979 by A.D Blest from female specimens. In 2002, it was moved to the Haplinis genus and the male was described. The holotype is stored in Otago Museum.

== Description ==
The male is recorded at 3.8mm in length whereas the female is 4.08mm. The male has a dark brown cephalothorax, light brown legs and abdomen that is almost black with lateral white stripes. The female has a greyish yellow cephalothorax, greyish yellow legs and dark grey abdomen with pale blotches.

== Distribution ==
This species is only known from the South Island of New Zealand.

== Conservation status ==
Under the New Zealand Threat Classification System, this species is listed as "Not Threatened".
