= Haplinis diloris =

Conservation status
- Not Threatened (NZ TCS)

Scientific classification
- Domain: Eukaryota
- Kingdom: Animalia
- Phylum: Arthropoda
- Subphylum: Chelicerata
- Class: Arachnida
- Order: Araneae
- Infraorder: Araneomorphae
- Family: Linyphiidae
- Genus: Haplinis
- Species: H. diloris

Binomial name
- Haplinis diloris (Urquhart, 1886)

Synonyms
- Linyphia diloris; Paralinyphia diloris; Mynoglenes diloris

Species of spider

Haplinis diloris is a species of sheet weaver spider endemic to New Zealand.

== Taxonomy ==
This species was described as Linyphia diloris in 1886 by Arthur Urquhart from female and male specimens collected in Auckland. In 1933 it was transferred to the Paralinyphia genus, then moved to the Mynoglenes genus in 1978. It was most recently transferred to the Haplinis genus in 1994.

== Description ==
The female is recorded at 5.75mm in length whereas the male is 5.34mm. The male has a brown cephalothorax and yellow brown legs. The abdomen is dark grey with pale markings dorsally. The female abdomen is similar but paler in colour.

== Distribution ==
This species is widespread throughout New Zealand.

== Conservation status ==
Under the New Zealand Threat Classification System, this species is listed as "Not Threatened".
