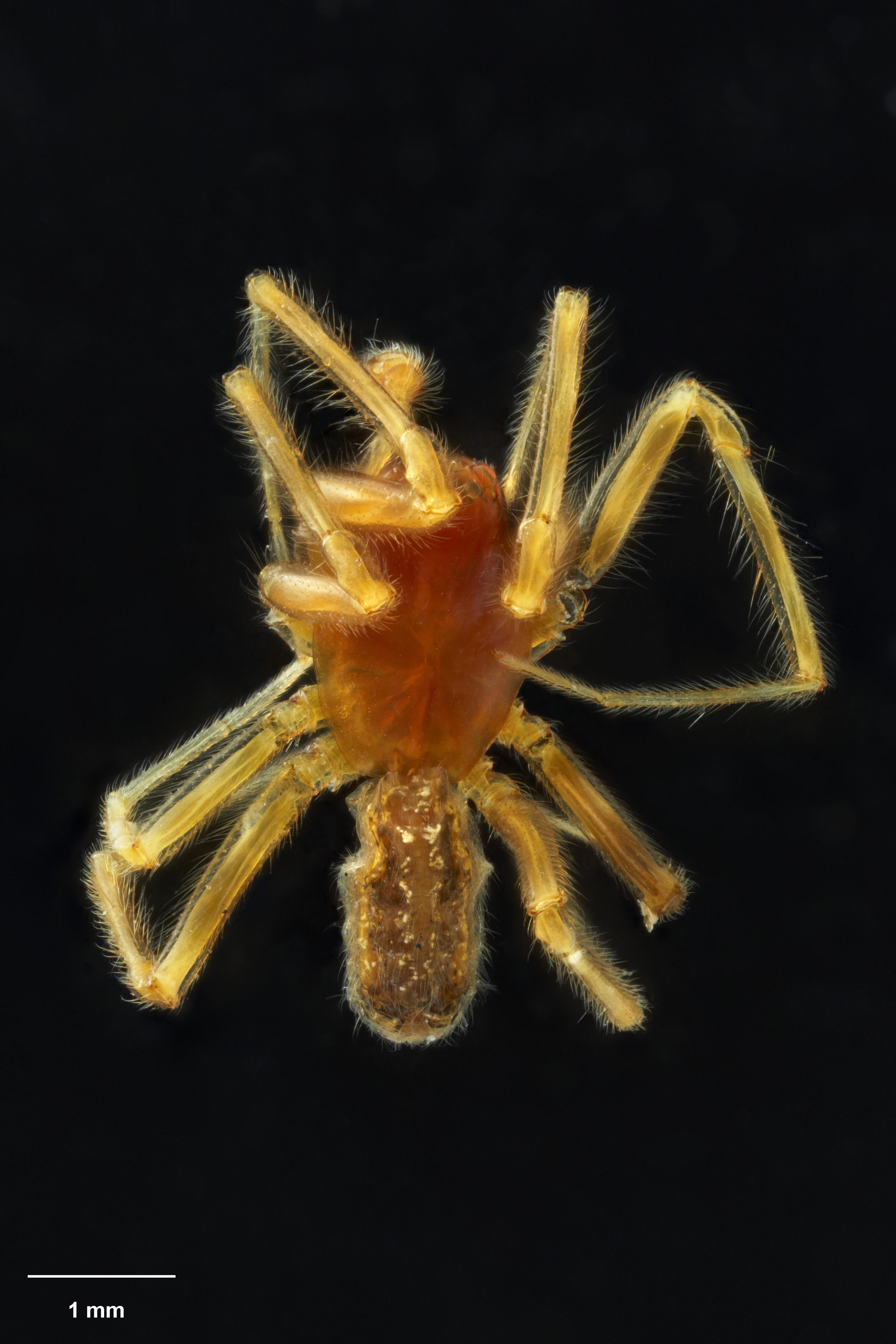

Conservation status
- Naturally Uncommon (NZ TCS)

Scientific classification
- Domain: Eukaryota
- Kingdom: Animalia
- Phylum: Arthropoda
- Subphylum: Chelicerata
- Class: Arachnida
- Order: Araneae
- Infraorder: Araneomorphae
- Family: Linyphiidae
- Genus: Haplinis
- Species: H. silvicola

Binomial name
- Haplinis silvicola (Blest, 1979)

Synonyms
- Mynoglenes silvicola

= Haplinis silvicola =

Species of spider

Haplinis silvicola is a species of sheet weaver spider endemic to New Zealand.

== Taxonomy ==
This species was described as Mynoglenes silvicola in 1979 by A.D Blest from male and female specimens. The holotype is stored in Te Papa Museum under registration number AS.000110.

== Description ==
The male is recorded at 4.17mm in length whereas the female is 4.58mm. This species has a dark brown carapace, brown legs and an abdomen that is coloured darkly with white spots.

== Distribution ==
This species is only known from the South Island of New Zealand.

== Conservation status ==
Under the New Zealand Threat Classification System, this species is listed as "Naturally Uncommon" with the qualifier of "Range Restricted".
