= Haplinis abbreviata =

Conservation status
- Not Threatened (NZ TCS)

Scientific classification
- Domain: Eukaryota
- Kingdom: Animalia
- Phylum: Arthropoda
- Subphylum: Chelicerata
- Class: Arachnida
- Order: Araneae
- Infraorder: Araneomorphae
- Family: Linyphiidae
- Genus: Haplinis
- Species: H. abbreviata

Binomial name
- Haplinis abbreviata (Blest, 1979)

Synonyms
- Mynoglenes abbreviata

Species of spider

Haplinis abbreviata is a species of sheet weaver spider endemic to New Zealand.

== Taxonomy ==
This species was described as Mynoglenes abbreviata in 1979 by A.D Blest from male specimens. In 2002 it was transferred to Haplinis and the female was described. The holotype is stored in Otago Museum.

== Description ==
The female is recorded at 5.13mm in length. This species has a dark brown prosoma, brown legs and abdomen that is almost black with white markings.

== Distribution ==
This species is known from the North Island and the upper part of the South Island of New Zealand.

== Conservation status ==
Under the New Zealand Threat Classification System, this species is listed as "Not Threatened".
