= Haplinis titan =

Conservation status
- Not Threatened (NZ TCS)

Scientific classification
- Domain: Eukaryota
- Kingdom: Animalia
- Phylum: Arthropoda
- Subphylum: Chelicerata
- Class: Arachnida
- Order: Araneae
- Infraorder: Araneomorphae
- Family: Linyphiidae
- Genus: Haplinis
- Species: H. titan

Binomial name
- Haplinis titan (Blest, 1979)

Synonyms
- Mynoglenes titan

Species of spider

Haplinis titan is a species of sheet weaver spider endemic to New Zealand.

== Taxonomy ==
This species was described as Mynoglenes titan in 1979 by A.D Blest from male and female specimens. It was moved to the Haplinis genus in 1984. This holotype is stored in Otago Museum.

== Description ==
The male is recorded at 9mm in length whereas the female is 7.91mm. This species has a dark brown cephalothorax and legs. The abdomen is brown with various pale markings.

== Distribution ==
This species is known from throughout New Zealand.

== Conservation status ==
Under the New Zealand Threat Classification System, this species is listed as "Not Threatened".
