= Haplinis rufocephala =

Conservation status
- Naturally Uncommon (NZ TCS)

Scientific classification
- Domain: Eukaryota
- Kingdom: Animalia
- Phylum: Arthropoda
- Subphylum: Chelicerata
- Class: Arachnida
- Order: Araneae
- Infraorder: Araneomorphae
- Family: Linyphiidae
- Genus: Haplinis
- Species: H. rufocephala

Binomial name
- Haplinis rufocephala (Urquhart, 1888)

Synonyms
- Linyphia rufocephala; Paralinyphia rufocephala; Mynoglenes rufocephala; Mynoglenes insolens; Linyphia antipodiana; Mynoglenes rufocephalia

Species of spider

Haplinis rufocephala is a species of sheet weaver spider endemic to New Zealand.

== Taxonomy ==
This species was described as Linyphia rufocephala in 1888 by Arthur Urquhart from female and male specimens. It was most recently revised in 1979. The holotype is stored in Canterbury Museum.

== Description ==
The male is recorded at 4.88mm in length whereas the female is 5.5mm. The male has a chestnut brown cephalothorax, pale brown legs and abdomen with dark lateral bands. The female is similar, but the abdomen lateral bands that contrast with the background colour more.

== Distribution ==
This species is only known from Chatham Island in New Zealand.

== Conservation status ==
Under the New Zealand Threat Classification System, this species is listed as "Naturally Uncommon" with the qualifiers of "Island Endemic" and "Range Restricted".
