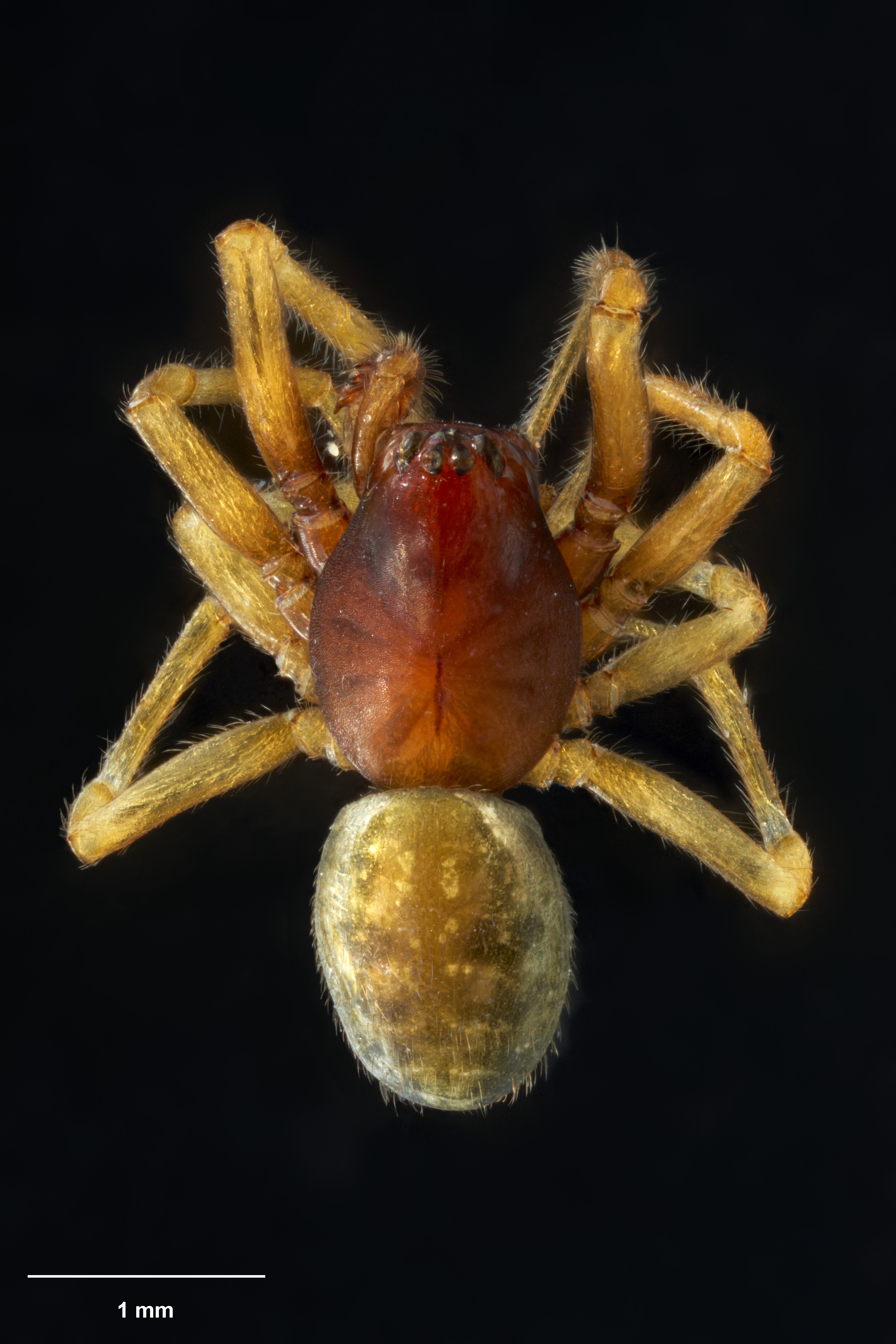
- Haplinis exigua

Scientific classification
- Kingdom: Animalia
- Phylum: Arthropoda
- Subphylum: Chelicerata
- Class: Arachnida
- Order: Araneae
- Infraorder: Araneomorphae
- Family: Linyphiidae
- Genus: Haplinis; Simon, 1894

Type species
- H. subclathrata Simon, 1894

Species
- 39, see text

Synonyms
- Mynoglenes Simon, 1905; Paralinyphia Bryant, 1933

= Haplinis =

Genus of spiders

Haplinis is a genus of South Pacific dwarf spiders that was first described by Eugène Louis Simon in 1894.

== Species ==
As of May 2019 it contains thirty-nine species, found in Australia and New Zealand:

- Haplinis abbreviata (Blest, 1979) – New Zealand
- Haplinis alticola Blest & Vink, 2002 – New Zealand
- Haplinis anomala Blest & Vink, 2003 – New Zealand
- Haplinis antipodiana Blest & Vink, 2002 – New Zealand
- Haplinis attenuata Blest & Vink, 2002 – New Zealand
- Haplinis australis Blest & Vink, 2003 – Australia (Tasmania)
- Haplinis banksi (Blest, 1979) – New Zealand
- Haplinis brevipes (Blest, 1979) – New Zealand (Chatham Is.)
- Haplinis chiltoni (Hogg, 1911) – New Zealand
- Haplinis contorta (Blest, 1979) – New Zealand
- Haplinis diloris (Urquhart, 1886) – New Zealand
- Haplinis dunstani (Blest, 1979) – New Zealand
- Haplinis exigua Blest & Vink, 2002 – New Zealand
- Haplinis fluviatilis (Blest, 1979) – New Zealand
- Haplinis fucatinia (Urquhart, 1894) – New Zealand
- Haplinis fulvolineata Blest & Vink, 2002 – New Zealand
- Haplinis horningi (Blest, 1979) – New Zealand
- Haplinis inexacta (Blest, 1979) – New Zealand
- Haplinis innotabilis (Blest, 1979) – New Zealand
- Haplinis insignis (Blest, 1979) – New Zealand
- Haplinis major (Blest, 1979) – New Zealand
- Haplinis marplesi Blest & Vink, 2003 – New Zealand
- Haplinis minutissima (Blest, 1979) – New Zealand
- Haplinis morainicola Blest & Vink, 2002 – New Zealand
- Haplinis mundenia (Urquhart, 1894) – New Zealand
- Haplinis paradoxa (Blest, 1979) – New Zealand
- Haplinis redacta (Blest, 1979) – New Zealand
- Haplinis rufocephala (Urquhart, 1888) – New Zealand
- Haplinis rupicola (Blest, 1979) – New Zealand
- Haplinis silvicola (Blest, 1979) – New Zealand
- Haplinis similis (Blest, 1979) – New Zealand
- Haplinis subclathrata Simon, 1894 (type) – New Zealand
- Haplinis subdola (O. Pickard-Cambridge, 1880) – New Zealand
- Haplinis subtilis Blest & Vink, 2002 – New Zealand
- Haplinis taranakii (Blest, 1979) – New Zealand
- Haplinis tegulata (Blest, 1979) – New Zealand
- Haplinis titan (Blest, 1979) – New Zealand
- Haplinis tokaanuae Blest & Vink, 2002 – New Zealand
- Haplinis wairarapa Blest & Vink, 2002 – New Zealand
