= Haplinis fucatinia =

Conservation status
- Not Threatened (NZ TCS)

Scientific classification
- Domain: Eukaryota
- Kingdom: Animalia
- Phylum: Arthropoda
- Subphylum: Chelicerata
- Class: Arachnida
- Order: Araneae
- Infraorder: Araneomorphae
- Family: Linyphiidae
- Genus: Haplinis
- Species: H. fucatinia

Binomial name
- Haplinis fucatinia (Urquhart, 1894)

Synonyms
- Linyphia fucatinia; Paralinyphia fucatinia; Mynoglenes fucatinia

Species of spider

Haplinis fucatinia is a species of sheet weaver spider endemic to New Zealand.

== Taxonomy ==
This species was described as Linyphia fucatinia in 1894 by Arthur Urquhart from a single male specimen. It was most recently revised in 1979. The syntype is stored in Canterbury Museum.

== Description ==
The male is recorded at 2.96mm in length whereas the female is 3.24mm. The male has a dark brown cephalothorax and legs that are black and yellow. The abdomen is black with white markings dorsally.

== Distribution ==
This species is known from scattered localities throughout New Zealand.

== Conservation status ==
Under the New Zealand Threat Classification System, this species is listed as "Not Threatened".
