= Haplinis tegulata =

Conservation status
- Naturally Uncommon (NZ TCS)

Scientific classification
- Domain: Eukaryota
- Kingdom: Animalia
- Phylum: Arthropoda
- Subphylum: Chelicerata
- Class: Arachnida
- Order: Araneae
- Infraorder: Araneomorphae
- Family: Linyphiidae
- Genus: Haplinis
- Species: H. tegulata

Binomial name
- Haplinis tegulata (Blest, 1979)

Synonyms
- Mynoglenes tegulata

Species of spider

Haplinis tegulata is a species of sheet weaver spider endemic to New Zealand.

== Taxonomy ==
This species was described as Mynoglenes tegulata in 1979 by A.D Blest from male and female specimens. The holotype is stored in the New Zealand Arthropod Collection.

== Description ==
The male is recorded at 3.67mm in length whereas the female is 4.84mm. This species has a pale yellow cephalothorax, yellow legs and an abdomen that has a grey chevron pattern dorsally.

== Distribution ==
This species is only known from Chatham Island, New Zealand.

== Conservation status ==
Under the New Zealand Threat Classification System, this species is listed as "Naturally Uncommon" with the qualifiers of "Island Endemic" and "Range Restricted".
