= Haplinis insignis =

Conservation status
- Data Deficient (NZ TCS)

Scientific classification
- Domain: Eukaryota
- Kingdom: Animalia
- Phylum: Arthropoda
- Subphylum: Chelicerata
- Class: Arachnida
- Order: Araneae
- Infraorder: Araneomorphae
- Family: Linyphiidae
- Genus: Haplinis
- Species: H. insignis

Binomial name
- Haplinis insignis (Blest, 1979)

Synonyms
- Mynoglenes insignis

Species of spider

Haplinis insignis is a species of sheet weaver spider endemic to New Zealand.

== Taxonomy ==
This species was described as Mynoglenes insignis in 1979 by A.D Blest from female specimens. In 2002, the male was described and the species was moved to the Haplinis genus. The holotype is stored in Otago Museum.

== Description ==
The male is recorded at 2.25mm in length whereas the female is 3.84mm. The female has a dark brown cephalothorax and yellow brown legs. The abdomen is grey with a black chevron pattern dorsally. The male is similar but the abdomen has no markings.

== Distribution ==
This species is only known from Canterbury, New Zealand.

== Conservation status ==
Under the New Zealand Threat Classification System, this species is listed as "Data Deficient" with the qualifiers of "Data Poor: Size" and "Data Poor: Trend".
