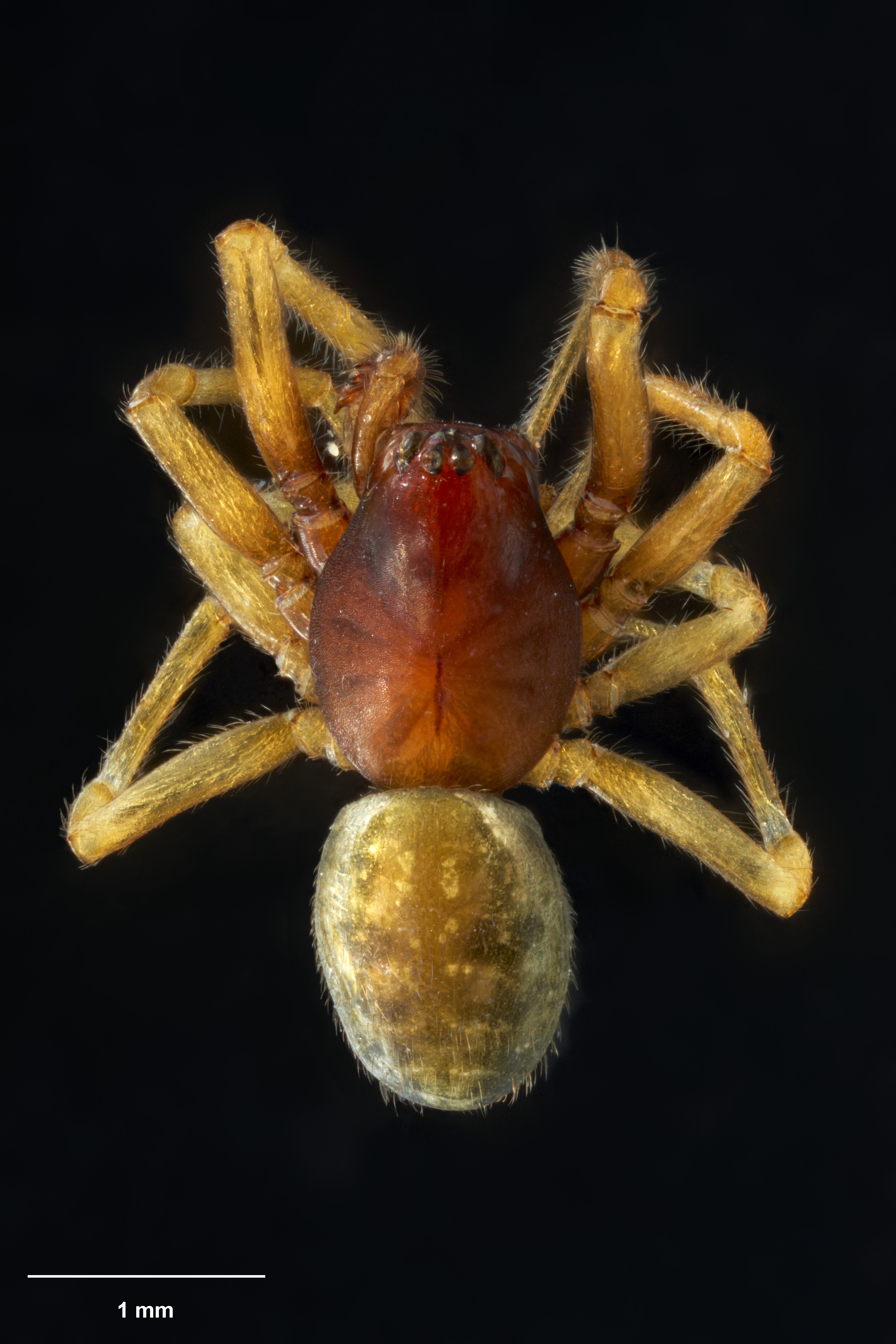

Conservation status
- Data Deficient (NZ TCS)

Scientific classification
- Domain: Eukaryota
- Kingdom: Animalia
- Phylum: Arthropoda
- Subphylum: Chelicerata
- Class: Arachnida
- Order: Araneae
- Infraorder: Araneomorphae
- Family: Linyphiidae
- Genus: Haplinis
- Species: H. exigua

Binomial name
- Haplinis exigua Blest & Vink, 2002

= Haplinis exigua =

Species of spider

Haplinis exigua is a species of sheet weaver spider endemic to New Zealand.

== Taxonomy ==
This species was described in 2002 by A.D Blest and Cor Vink from male and female specimens. The holotype is stored Te Papa Museum under registration number AS.000673.

== Description ==
The male is recorded at 2.88mm in length whereas the female is 3.26mm. This species has a uniform brown cephalothorax and black abdomen. The female abdomen has white spots.

== Distribution ==
This species is only known from Geraldine, New Zealand.

== Conservation status ==
Under the New Zealand Threat Classification System, this species is listed as "Data Deficient" with the qualifiers of "Data Poor: Size", "Data Poor: Trend" and "One Location".
