= Haplinis minutissima =

Conservation status
- Naturally Uncommon (NZ TCS)

Scientific classification
- Domain: Eukaryota
- Kingdom: Animalia
- Phylum: Arthropoda
- Subphylum: Chelicerata
- Class: Arachnida
- Order: Araneae
- Infraorder: Araneomorphae
- Family: Linyphiidae
- Genus: Haplinis
- Species: H. minutissima

Binomial name
- Haplinis minutissima (Blest, 1979)

Synonyms
- Mynoglenes minutissima

Species of spider

Haplinis minutissima is a species of sheet weaver spider endemic to New Zealand.

== Taxonomy ==
This species was described as Mynoglenes minutissima in 1979 by A.D Blest from female specimens. In 2002, it was moved to the Haplinis genus and the male was described. The holotype is stored in the New Zealand Arthropod Collection.

== Description ==
The male is recorded at 3.5mm in length whereas the female is 2.28mm. The male has a dark brown cephalothorax, brown legs and a dark grey abdomen. The female has a yellow cephalothorax, yellow legs and a grey abdomen.

== Distribution ==
This species is only known from Antipodes Island in New Zealand.

== Conservation status ==
Under the New Zealand Threat Classification System, this species is listed as "Naturally Uncommon" with the qualifiers of "Island Endemic" and "One Location".
