= Haplinis subdola =

Conservation status
- Not Threatened (NZ TCS)

Scientific classification
- Domain: Eukaryota
- Kingdom: Animalia
- Phylum: Arthropoda
- Subphylum: Chelicerata
- Class: Arachnida
- Order: Araneae
- Infraorder: Araneomorphae
- Family: Linyphiidae
- Genus: Haplinis
- Species: H. subdola

Binomial name
- Haplinis subdola (O. Pickard-Cambridge, 1880)

Synonyms
- Linyphia subdola; Mynoglenes subdola

Species of spider

Haplinis subdola is a species of sheet weaver spider endemic to New Zealand.

== Taxonomy ==
This species was described as Linyphia subdola in 1880 by Octavious Pickard-Cambridge from male and female specimens. It was moved to the Mynoglenes and then the Haplinis genus in 1979 and 2002 respectively.

== Description ==
The male is recorded at 3.58mm in length whereas the female is 4.67mm. This species has a dusky brown cephalothorax, brown legs and abdomen that has pale markings dorsally.

== Distribution ==
This species is only known from the South Island of New Zealand.

== Conservation status ==
Under the New Zealand Threat Classification System, this species is listed as "Not Threatened".
