= Brachycerasphora =

Scientific classification
- Kingdom: Animalia
- Phylum: Arthropoda
- Subphylum: Chelicerata
- Class: Arachnida
- Order: Araneae
- Infraorder: Araneomorphae
- Family: Linyphiidae
- Genus: Brachycerasphora; Denis, 1962

Type species
- B. monocerotum Denis, 1962

Species
- 5, see text

Genus of spiders

Brachycerasphora is a genus of dwarf spiders that was first described by J. Denis in 1962.

== Species ==
As of May 2019 it contains five species:

- Brachycerasphora connectens Denis, 1964 – Libya
- Brachycerasphora convexa (Simon, 1884) – Algeria, Tunisia, Israel
- Brachycerasphora femoralis (O. Pickard-Cambridge, 1872) – Israel
- Brachycerasphora monocerotum Denis, 1962 (type) – Libya
- Brachycerasphora parvicornis (Simon, 1884) – Egypt, Israel
