= Brachycerasphora connectens =

Scientific classification
- Kingdom: Animalia
- Phylum: Arthropoda
- Subphylum: Chelicerata
- Class: Arachnida
- Order: Araneae
- Infraorder: Araneomorphae
- Family: Linyphiidae
- Genus: Brachycerasphora
- Species: B. connectens

Binomial name
- Brachycerasphora connectens Denis, 1962

Species of spider

Brachycerasphora connectens is a species of dwarf spider found in Libya. It was first described by Jacques Denis in 1962.

== Description ==
The male member of this species has been described as having a cephalothorax that measures 0.90 mm with dark red-brown color and a wide black margin. It has a total body length of 2 mm.
