= Cassafroneta =

Conservation status
- Naturally Uncommon (NZ TCS)

Scientific classification
- Kingdom: Animalia
- Phylum: Arthropoda
- Subphylum: Chelicerata
- Class: Arachnida
- Order: Araneae
- Infraorder: Araneomorphae
- Family: Linyphiidae
- Genus: Cassafroneta; Blest, 1979
- Species: C. forsteri

Binomial name
- Cassafroneta forsteri Blest, 1979

Genus of spiders

Cassafroneta is a monotypic genus of South Pacific dwarf spiders containing the single species, Cassafroneta forsteri. It was first described by A. D. Blest in 1979, and has only been found in New Zealand.

== Taxonomy ==
This species was described in 1979 by A.D. Blest from a male specimen. It was most recently revised in 2002, in which the female was described. This species is the sole member of the Cassafroneta genus.

== Description ==
The female is recorded at 2.13mm in length whereas the male is 2.28mm.

== Distribution ==
This species is only known from New Zealand.

== Conservation status ==
Under the New Zealand Threat Classification System, this species is listed as "Naturally Uncommon" with the qualifier of "Biologically Sparse".
