= Hyperafroneta =

Scientific classification
- Kingdom: Animalia
- Phylum: Arthropoda
- Subphylum: Chelicerata
- Class: Arachnida
- Order: Araneae
- Infraorder: Araneomorphae
- Family: Linyphiidae
- Genus: Hyperafroneta; Blest, 1979
- Species: H. obscura

Binomial name
- Hyperafroneta obscura Blest, 1979

Genus of spiders

Hyperafroneta is a monotypic genus of South Pacific dwarf spiders containing the single species, Hyperafroneta obscura. It was first described by A. D. Blest in 1979, and has only been found in New Zealand.

== Taxonomy ==
This species was described in 1979 by A.D Blest from male and female specimens. The holotype is stored in Otago Museum.

== Description ==
The male is recorded at 2.2mm in length whereas the female is 2.68mm. This species has a brownish yellow cephalothorax and yellow legs. The abdomen is grey with whitish markings dorsally.

== Distribution ==
This species is only known from the South Island of New Zealand.

== Conservation status ==
Under the New Zealand Threat Classification System, this species is listed as "Not Threatened".
