= Epiceraticelus =

Scientific classification
- Kingdom: Animalia
- Phylum: Arthropoda
- Subphylum: Chelicerata
- Class: Arachnida
- Order: Araneae
- Infraorder: Araneomorphae
- Family: Linyphiidae
- Genus: Epiceraticelus; Crosby & Bishop, 1931

Genus of spiders

Epiceraticelus is a genus of North American dwarf spiders containing two species: Epiceraticelus fluvialis and Epiceraticelus mandyae. The first described species in the genus, E. fluvialis, was first described by C. R. Crosby & S. C. Bishop in 1931, and has only been found in the Midwestern and Eastern United States. The second species, E. mandyae, was described in 2019 by M. L. Draney et al. and occurs in the Southeastern United States from Eastern New Jersey south to Georgia and west to Louisiana. The male of E. mandyae has a curved proboscis that extends from below the eyes. Epiceraticelus mandyae was named after the late arachnologist, Amanda Howe, in honor of her contributions to the North American arachnology community.
