= Dicornua =

Scientific classification
- Kingdom: Animalia
- Phylum: Arthropoda
- Subphylum: Chelicerata
- Class: Arachnida
- Order: Araneae
- Infraorder: Araneomorphae
- Family: Linyphiidae
- Genus: Dicornua; Oi, 1960
- Species: D. hikosanensis

Binomial name
- Dicornua hikosanensis Oi, 1960

Genus of spiders

Dicornua is a monotypic genus of Asian dwarf spiders containing the single species, Dicornua hikosanensis. It was first described by R. Oi in 1960, and has only been found in Japan.
