= Emenista =

Scientific classification
- Kingdom: Animalia
- Phylum: Arthropoda
- Subphylum: Chelicerata
- Class: Arachnida
- Order: Araneae
- Infraorder: Araneomorphae
- Family: Linyphiidae
- Genus: Emenista; Simon, 1894
- Species: E. bisinuosa

Binomial name
- Emenista bisinuosa Simon, 1894

Genus of spiders

Emenista is a monotypic genus of Asian dwarf spiders containing the single species, Emenista bisinuosa. It was first described by Eugène Louis Simon in 1894, and has only been found in India.
