= List of Linyphiidae species (I–P) =

This page lists all described species of the spider family Linyphiidae as of July 12, 2020, from I to P, of World Spider Catalog version 21.0

== Ibadana ==
Ibadana Locket & Russell-Smith, 1980

- Ibadana cuspidata Locket & Russell-Smith, 1980 – Nigeria, Cameroon

== Iberoneta ==
Iberoneta Deeleman-Reinhold, 1984

- Iberoneta nasewoa Deeleman-Reinhold, 1984 – Spain

== Icariella ==
Icariella Brignoli, 1979

- Icariella hauseri Brignoli, 1979 – Greece

== Idionella ==
Idionella Banks, 1893

- Idionella anomala (Gertsch & Ivie, 1936) – USA
- Idionella deserta (Gertsch & Ivie, 1936) – USA
- Idionella formosa (Banks, 1892) (type species) – USA
  - Idionella formosa pista (Chamberlin, 1949) – USA
- Idionella nesiotes (Crosby, 1924) – USA
- Idionella rugosa (Crosby, 1905) – USA
- Idionella sclerata (Ivie & Barrows, 1935) – USA, Mexico
- Idionella titivillitium (Crosby & Bishop, 1925) – USA
- Idionella tugana (Chamberlin, 1949) – USA

== Improphantes ==
Improphantes Saaristo & Tanasevitch, 1996

- Improphantes biconicus (Tanasevitch, 1992) – Russia, Japan
- Improphantes breviscapus Tanasevitch, 2013 – Israel
- Improphantes complicatus (Emerton, 1882) – Holarctic
- Improphantes contus Tanasevitch & Piterkina, 2007 – Kazakhstan
- Improphantes cypriot Tanasevitch, 2011 – Cyprus
- Improphantes decolor (Westring, 1861) – Europe, North Africa
- Improphantes djazairi (Bosmans, 1985) – Algeria
- Improphantes falcatus (Bosmans, 1979) – Kenya
- Improphantes flexilis (Tanasevitch, 1986) – Russia
- Improphantes furcabilis (Wunderlich, 1987) – Canary Islands
- Improphantes geniculatus (Kulczynski, 1898) – Europe, Russia
- Improphantes holmi (Kronestedt, 1975) – Sweden, Russia
- Improphantes huberti (Wunderlich, 1980) – Corsica
- Improphantes improbulus (Simon, 1929) (type species) – Palearctic
- Improphantes mauensis (Caporiacco, 1949) – Kenya
- Improphantes multidentatus (Wunderlich, 1987) – Canary Islands
- Improphantes nitidus (Thorell, 1875) – Europe
- Improphantes pamiricus (Tanasevitch, 1989) – Tajikistan
- Improphantes potanini (Tanasevitch, 1989) – Kyrgyzstan
- Improphantes turok Tanasevitch, 2011 – Turkey

== Incestophantes ==
Incestophantes Tanasevitch, 1992

- Incestophantes altaicus Tanasevitch, 2000 – Russia
- Incestophantes amotus (Tanasevitch, 1990) – Russia, Georgia, Kazakhstan
- Incestophantes ancus Tanasevitch, 1996 – Russia
- Incestophantes annulatus (Kulczynski, 1882) – Eastern Europe
- Incestophantes bonus Tanasevitch, 1996 – Russia
- Incestophantes brevilamellus Tanasevitch, 2013 – Russia
- Incestophantes camtchadalicus (Tanasevitch, 1988) – Russia
- Incestophantes crucifer (Menge, 1866) – Palearctic
- Incestophantes cymbialis (Tanasevitch, 1988) – Russia
- Incestophantes duplicatus (Emerton, 1913) – USA, Canada, Alaska
- Incestophantes frigidus (Simon, 1884) – Europe
- Incestophantes incestoides (Tanasevitch & Eskov, 1987) – Russia
- Incestophantes incestus (L. Koch, 1879) (type species) – Russia, Mongolia
- Incestophantes khakassicus Tanasevitch, 1996 – Russia
- Incestophantes kochiellus (Strand, 1900) – Norway, Sweden, Finland, Russia, China
- Incestophantes kotulai (Kulczynski, 1905) – Central Europe
- Incestophantes lamprus (Chamberlin, 1920) – USA, Canada
- Incestophantes laricetorum (Tanasevitch & Eskov, 1987) – Russia
- Incestophantes logunovi Tanasevitch, 1996 – Russia
- Incestophantes mercedes (Chamberlin & Ivie, 1943) – USA
- Incestophantes shetekaurii Otto & Tanasevitch, 2015
- Incestophantes tuvensis Tanasevitch, 1996 – Russia
- Incestophantes washingtoni (Zorsch, 1937) – USA, Canada

== Indophantes ==
Indophantes Saaristo & Tanasevitch, 2003

- Indophantes agamus Tanasevitch & Saaristo, 2006 – Nepal
- Indophantes barat Saaristo & Tanasevitch, 2003 – Sumatra
- Indophantes bengalensis Saaristo & Tanasevitch, 2003 – India
- Indophantes digitulus (Thaler, 1987) – India, Nepal, Pakistan
- Indophantes halonatus (Li & Zhu, 1995) – China
- Indophantes kalimantanus Saaristo & Tanasevitch, 2003 (type species) – Borneo
- Indophantes kinabalu Saaristo & Tanasevitch, 2003 – Borneo
- Indophantes lehtineni Saaristo & Tanasevitch, 2003 – Borneo
- Indophantes pallidus Saaristo & Tanasevitch, 2003 – India
- Indophantes ramosus Tanasevitch, 2006 – China
- Indophantes sumatera Saaristo & Tanasevitch, 2003 – Sumatra
- Indophantes tonglu Tanasevitch, 2011 – India

== Intecymbium ==
Intecymbium Miller, 2007

- Intecymbium antarcticum (Simon, 1895) – Chile, Argentina

== Ipa ==
Ipa Saaristo, 2007

- Ipa keyserlingi (Ausserer, 1867) (type species) – Palearctic
- Ipa pepticus (Tanasevitch, 1988) – Kazakhstan, Turkmenistan, Mongolia
- Ipa spasskyi (Tanasevitch, 1986) – Turkey to Central Asia
- Ipa terrenus (L. Koch, 1879) – Europe, Russia

== Ipaoides ==
Ipaoides Tanasevitch, 2008

- Ipaoides saaristoi Tanasevitch, 2008 – China

== Islandiana ==
Islandiana Braendegaard, 1932

- Islandiana cavealis Ivie, 1965 – USA
- Islandiana coconino Ivie, 1965 – USA
- Islandiana cristata Eskov, 1987 – Russia, Alaska, Canada
- Islandiana falsifica (Keyserling, 1886) (type species) – Holarctic
- Islandiana flaveola (Banks, 1892) – USA, Canada
- Islandiana flavoides Ivie, 1965 – USA
- Islandiana holmi Ivie, 1965 – USA
- Islandiana lasalana (Chamberlin & Ivie, 1935) – USA
- Islandiana lewisi Milne & Wells, 2018 – USA
- Islandiana longisetosa (Emerton, 1882) – USA, Canada, Alaska
- Islandiana mimbres Ivie, 1965 – USA
- Islandiana muma Ivie, 1965 – USA
- Islandiana princeps Braendegaard, 1932 – USA, Canada, Greenland, Iceland
- Islandiana speophila Ivie, 1965 – USA
- Islandiana unicornis Ivie, 1965 – USA

== Ivielum ==
Ivielum Eskov, 1988

- Ivielum sibiricum Eskov, 1988 – Russia, Mongolia, Canada

== Jacksonella ==
Jacksonella Millidge, 1951

- Jacksonella bidens Tanasevitch, 2011 – Cyprus, Samos
- Jacksonella falconeri (Jackson, 1908) (type species) – Europe
- Jacksonella sexoculata Paik & Yaginuma, 1969 – Korea

== Jalapyphantes ==
Jalapyphantes Gertsch & Davis, 1946

- Jalapyphantes cuernavaca Gertsch & Davis, 1946 (type species) – Mexico
- Jalapyphantes minoratus Gertsch & Davis, 1946 – Mexico
- Jalapyphantes obscurus Millidge, 1991 – Ecuador
- Jalapyphantes puebla Gertsch & Davis, 1946 – Mexico

== Janetschekia ==
Janetschekia Schenkel, 1939

- Janetschekia monodon (O. P.-Cambridge, 1872) (type species) – Switzerland, Germany, Austria, Italy
- Janetschekia necessaria Tanasevitch, 1985 – Central Asia

== Javagone ==
Javagone Tanasevitch, 2020

- Javagone maribaya Tanasevitch, 2020 – Java

== Javanaria ==
Javanaria Tanasevitch, 2020

- Javanaria gracilipes Tanasevitch, 2020 – Java

== Javanyphia ==
Javanyphia Tanasevitch, 2020

- Javanyphia gede Tanasevitch, 2020 – Java

== Johorea ==
Johorea Locket, 1982

- Johorea decorata Locket, 1982 – Malaysia

== Juanfernandezia ==
Juanfernandezia Kocak & Kemal, 2008

- Juanfernandezia melanocephala (Millidge, 1991) – Juan Fernandez Islands

== Kaestneria ==
Kaestneria Wiehle, 1956

- Kaestneria bicultrata Chen & Yin, 2000 – China
- Kaestneria dorsalis (Wider, 1834) (type species) – Palearctic
- Kaestneria longissima (Zhu & Wen, 1983) – Russia, China
- Kaestneria minima Locket, 1982 – Malaysia
- Kaestneria pullata (O. P.-Cambridge, 1863) – Holarctic
- Kaestneria rufula (Hackman, 1954) – USA, Canada
- Kaestneria torrentum (Kulczynski, 1882) – Eastern Europe
- Kaestneria valentissima Irfan & Peng, 2018 – China

== Kagurargus ==
Kagurargus Ono, 2007

- Kagurargus kikuyai Ono, 2007 – Japan

== Kalimagone ==
Kalimagone Tanasevitch, 2017

- Kalimagone cuspidata Tanasevitch, 2017 (type species) − Malaysia (Borneo)
- Kalimagone rotunda Tanasevitch, 2017 − Malaysia (Borneo)

== Karita ==
Karita Tanasevitch, 2007

- Karita paludosa (Duffey, 1971) – Ireland, Britain, Belgium, Germany, Russia

== Kenocymbium ==
Kenocymbium Millidge & Russell-Smith, 1992

- Kenocymbium deelemanae Millidge & Russell-Smith, 1992 (type species) – Sumatra
- Kenocymbium simile Millidge & Russell-Smith, 1992 – Thailand

== Ketambea ==
Ketambea Millidge & Russell-Smith, 1992

- Ketambea acuta Tanasevitch, 2017 − Myanmar, Thailand
- Ketambea liupanensis (Tang & Song, 1992) − Russia (Far East), China
- Ketambea nigripectoris (Oi, 1960) − Russia (Far East), China, Korea, Japan
- Ketambea permixta Millidge & Russell-Smith, 1992 – Java
- Ketambea rostrata Millidge & Russell-Smith, 1992 (type species) – Sumatra
- Ketambea vermiformis Millidge & Russell-Smith, 1992 – Java

== Kikimora ==
Kikimora Eskov, 1988

- Kikimora palustris Eskov, 1988 – Finland, Russia

== Knischatiria ==
Knischatiria Wunderlich, 1976

- Knischatiria abnormis Wunderlich, 1976 (type species) – Queensland
- Knischatiria longispina Wunderlich, 1995 – Sumatra
- Knischatiria tuberosa Wunderlich, 1995 – Malaysia

== Koinothrix ==
Koinothrix Jocque, 1981

- Koinothrix pequenops Jocque, 1981 – Cape Verde Islands

== Kolymocyba ==
Kolymocyba Eskov, 1989

- Kolymocyba petrophila Eskov, 1989 – Russia

== Kratochviliella ==
Kratochviliella Miller, 1938

- Kratochviliella bicapitata Miller, 1938 – Europe

== Labicymbium ==
Labicymbium Millidge, 1991

- Labicymbium ambiguum Millidge, 1991 – Colombia
- Labicymbium auctum Millidge, 1991 – Colombia
- Labicymbium avium Millidge, 1991 – Ecuador
- Labicymbium breve Millidge, 1991 – Colombia
- Labicymbium cognatum Millidge, 1991 – Peru
- Labicymbium cordiforme Millidge, 1991 – Colombia
- Labicymbium curitiba Rodrigues, 2008 – Brazil
- Labicymbium dentichele Millidge, 1991 – Peru
- Labicymbium exiguum Millidge, 1991 – Colombia
- Labicymbium fuscum Millidge, 1991 – Colombia
- Labicymbium jucundum Millidge, 1991 – Colombia
- Labicymbium majus Millidge, 1991 – Colombia
- Labicymbium montanum Millidge, 1991 – Venezuela
- Labicymbium nigrum Millidge, 1991 – Colombia
- Labicymbium opacum Millidge, 1991 – Colombia
- Labicymbium otti Rodrigues, 2008 – Brazil
- Labicymbium rancho Ott & Lise, 1997 – Brazil
- Labicymbium rusticulum (Keyserling, 1891) – Brazil
- Labicymbium sturmi Millidge, 1991 (type species) – Colombia
- Labicymbium sublestum Millidge, 1991 – Colombia, Ecuador

== Labulla ==
Labulla Simon, 1884

- Labulla flahaulti Simon, 1914 – France, Spain
- Labulla machadoi Hormiga & Scharff, 2005 – Portugal
- Labulla thoracica (Wider, 1834) (type species) – Europe, Russia

== Labullinyphia ==
Labullinyphia van Helsdingen, 1985

- Labullinyphia furcata Irfan & Peng, 2019 – China
- Labullinyphia tersa (Simon, 1894) – Sri Lanka

== Labullula ==
Labullula Strand, 1913

- Labullula annulipes Strand, 1913 – Cameroon, Central Africa, Angola, Comoro Islands

== Laetesia ==
Laetesia Simon, 1908

- Laetesia amoena Millidge, 1988 – New Zealand
- Laetesia asiatica Millidge, 1995 – Thailand
- Laetesia aucklandensis (Forster, 1964) – Auckland Islands
- Laetesia bellissima Millidge, 1988 – New Zealand
- Laetesia chathami Millidge, 1988 – New Zealand
- Laetesia distincta Millidge, 1988 – New Zealand
- Laetesia egregia Simon, 1908 – Western Australia
- Laetesia forsteri Wunderlich, 1976 – New South Wales
- Laetesia germana Millidge, 1988 – New Zealand
- Laetesia intermedia Blest & Vink, 2003 – New Zealand
- Laetesia leo van Helsdingen, 1972 – South Australia
- Laetesia minor Millidge, 1988 – New Zealand
- Laetesia mollita Simon, 1908 (type species) – Western Australia
- Laetesia nornalupiensis Wunderlich, 1976 – Western Australia
- Laetesia oceaniae (Berland, 1938) – New Hebrides
- Laetesia olvidada Blest & Vink, 2003 – New Zealand
- Laetesia paragermana Blest & Vink, 2003 – New Zealand
- Laetesia peramoena (O. P.-Cambridge, 1879) – New Zealand
- Laetesia prominens Millidge, 1988 – New Zealand
- Laetesia pseudamoena Blest & Vink, 2003 – New Zealand
- Laetesia pulcherrima Blest & Vink, 2003 – New Zealand
- Laetesia raveni Hormiga & Scharff, 2014 - Queensland, New South Wales
- Laetesia trispathulata (Urquhart, 1886) – New Zealand
- Laetesia weburdi (Urquhart, 1890) – New South Wales
- Laetesia woomeraensis Wunderlich, 1976 – South Australia

== Lamellasia ==
Lamellasia Tanasevitch, 2014

- Lamellasia mirabilis Tanasevitch, 2014 – Thailand

== Laminacauda ==
Laminacauda Millidge, 1985

- Laminacauda aluminensis Millidge, 1991 – Argentina
- Laminacauda amabilis (Keyserling, 1886) – Peru
- Laminacauda ansoni Millidge, 1991 – Juan Fernandez Islands
- Laminacauda argentinensis Millidge, 1985 – Argentina
- Laminacauda baerti Miller, 2007 – Panama, Colombia, Galapagos Islands
- Laminacauda boliviensis Millidge, 1985 – Bolivia
- Laminacauda cognata Millidge, 1991 – Juan Fernandez Islands
- Laminacauda defoei (F. O. P.-Cambridge, 1899) – Juan Fernandez Islands
- Laminacauda dentichelis (Berland, 1913) – Ecuador
- Laminacauda diffusa Millidge, 1985 (type species) – Chile, Argentina, Falkland Islands
- Laminacauda dysphorica (Keyserling, 1886) – Peru, Bolivia
- Laminacauda expers Millidge, 1991 – Peru
- Laminacauda fuegiana (Tullgren, 1901) – Chile, Falkland Islands
- Laminacauda gigas Millidge, 1991 – Juan Fernandez Islands
- Laminacauda grata Millidge, 1991 – Colombia
- Laminacauda insulana Millidge, 1985 – Tristan da Cunha
- Laminacauda luscinia Millidge, 1985 – Tristan da Cunha
- Laminacauda magna Millidge, 1991 – Juan Fernandez Islands
- Laminacauda malkini Millidge, 1991 – Juan Fernandez Islands
- Laminacauda maxima Millidge, 1985 – Tristan da Cunha
- Laminacauda montevidensis (Keyserling, 1878) – Brazil, Uruguay, Argentina
- Laminacauda monticola Millidge, 1985 – Bolivia
- Laminacauda nana Millidge, 1991 – Chile
- Laminacauda newtoni Millidge, 1985 – Chile, Argentina
- Laminacauda orina (Chamberlin, 1916) – Peru
- Laminacauda pacifica (Berland, 1924) – Juan Fernandez Islands
- Laminacauda parvipalpis Millidge, 1985 – Chile
- Laminacauda peruensis Millidge, 1985 – Peru
- Laminacauda plagiata (Tullgren, 1901) – Chile, Argentina, Falkland Islands
- Laminacauda propinqua Millidge, 1991 – Juan Fernandez Islands
- Laminacauda rubens Millidge, 1991 – Juan Fernandez Islands
- Laminacauda sacra Millidge, 1991 – Bolivia
- Laminacauda salsa Millidge, 1991 – Chile
- Laminacauda suavis Millidge, 1991 – Colombia
- Laminacauda sublimis Millidge, 1991 – Peru
- Laminacauda thayerae Millidge, 1985 – Chile
- Laminacauda tristani Millidge, 1985 – Tristan da Cunha
- Laminacauda tuberosa Millidge, 1991 – Juan Fernandez Islands
- Laminacauda tucumani Millidge, 1991 – Argentina
- Laminacauda vicana (Keyserling, 1886) – Peru
- Laminacauda villagra Millidge, 1991 – Juan Fernandez Islands

== Laminafroneta ==
Laminafroneta Merrett, 2004

- Laminafroneta bidentata (Holm, 1968) (type species) – Congo, Kenya, Rwanda
- Laminafroneta brevistyla (Holm, 1968) – Cameroon, Congo, Kenya, Tanzania
- Laminafroneta locketi (Merrett & Russell-Smith, 1996) – Ethiopia

== Laperousea ==
Laperousea Dalmas, 1917

- Laperousea blattifera (Urquhart, 1887) (type species) – Australia, New Zealand
- Laperousea quindecimpunctata (Urquhart, 1893) – Tasmania

== Lasiargus ==
Lasiargus Kulczynski, 1894

- Lasiargus hirsutoides Wunderlich, 1995 – Mongolia
- Lasiargus hirsutus (Menge, 1869) (type species) – Palearctic
- Lasiargus pilipes (Kulczynski, 1908) – Russia, Kazakhstan
- Lasiargus zhui Eskov & Marusik, 1994 – Russia

== Lepthyphantes ==
Lepthyphantes Menge, 1866

- Lepthyphantes abditus Tanasevitch, 1986 – Russia
- Lepthyphantes aberdarensis Russell-Smith & Jocque, 1986 – Kenya
- Lepthyphantes acuminifrons Bosmans, 1978 – Ethiopia
- Lepthyphantes aegeus Caporiacco, 1948 – Greece
- Lepthyphantes aelleni Denis, 1957 – Morocco
- Lepthyphantes afer (Simon, 1913) – Algeria
- Lepthyphantes ajoti Bosmans, 1991 – Algeria
- Lepthyphantes albimaculatus (O. P.-Cambridge, 1873) – St. Helena
- Lepthyphantes albuloides (O. P.-Cambridge, 1872) – Cyprus, Israel
- Lepthyphantes aldersoni Levi & Levi, 1955 – Canada
- Lepthyphantes allegrii Caporiacco, 1935 – Karakorum
- Lepthyphantes almoravidus Barrientos, 2020 – Morocco
- Lepthyphantes alpinus (Emerton, 1882) – Holarctic
- Lepthyphantes altissimus Hu, 2001 – China
- Lepthyphantes annulipes Caporiacco, 1935 – Karakorum
- Lepthyphantes arcticus (Keyserling, 1886) – Alaska
- Lepthyphantes badhkyzensis Tanasevitch, 1986 – Turkmenistan
- Lepthyphantes bakeri Scharff, 1990 – Tanzania
- Lepthyphantes balearicus Denis, 1961 – Balearic Islands
- Lepthyphantes bamboutensis Bosmans, 1986 – Cameroon
- Lepthyphantes bamilekei Bosmans, 1986 – Cameroon
- Lepthyphantes beroni Deltshev, 1979 – Greece
- Lepthyphantes beshkovi Deltshev, 1979 – Crete
- Lepthyphantes bhudbari Tikader, 1970 – India
- Lepthyphantes bidentatus Hormiga & Ribera, 1990 – Spain
- Lepthyphantes biospeleologorum Barrientos, 2020 – Morocco
- Lepthyphantes biseriatus Simon & Fage, 1922 – Kenya
  - Lepthyphantes biseriatus infans Simon & Fage, 1922 – East Africa
- Lepthyphantes bituberculatus Bosmans, 1978 – Ethiopia
- Lepthyphantes brevihamatus Bosmans, 1985 – Morocco
- Lepthyphantes brignolianus Deltshev, 1979 – Crete
- Lepthyphantes buensis Bosmans & Jocque, 1983 – Cameroon
- Lepthyphantes carlittensis Denis, 1952 – France
- Lepthyphantes cavernicola Paik & Yaginuma, 1969 – Korea
- Lepthyphantes centromeroides Kulczynski, 1914 – Balkans, Bulgaria, Romania
  - Lepthyphantes centromeroides carpaticus Dumitrescu & Georgescu, 1970 – Romania
- Lepthyphantes chamberlini Schenkel, 1950 – USA, Canada
- Lepthyphantes chita Scharff, 1990 – Tanzania
- Lepthyphantes christodeltshev van Helsdingen, 2009 – Greece
- Lepthyphantes concavus (Oi, 1960) – Japan
- Lepthyphantes constantinescui Georgescu, 1989 – Romania
- Lepthyphantes coomansi Bosmans, 1979 – Kenya
- Lepthyphantes cruciformis Tanasevitch, 1989 – Kyrgyzstan
- Lepthyphantes cruentatus Tanasevitch, 1987 – Russia, Georgia
- Lepthyphantes cultellifer Schenkel, 1936 – China
- Lepthyphantes deosaicola Caporiacco, 1935 – Karakorum
- Lepthyphantes dilutus (Thorell, 1875) – Sweden
- Lepthyphantes dolichoskeles Scharff, 1990 – Tanzania
- Lepthyphantes emarginatus Fage, 1931 – Algeria
- Lepthyphantes encaustus (Becker, 1879) – Moldavia
- Lepthyphantes ensifer Barrientos, 2020 – Morocco
- Lepthyphantes erigonoides Schenkel, 1936 – China
- Lepthyphantes escapus Tanasevitch, 1989 – Turkmenistan
- Lepthyphantes exvaginatus Deeleman-Reinhold, 1984 – Algeria
- Lepthyphantes fadriquei Barrientos, 2020 – Morocco
- Lepthyphantes fernandezi Berland, 1924 – Juan Fernandez Islands
- Lepthyphantes furcillifer Chamberlin & Ivie, 1933 – USA
- Lepthyphantes gadesi Fage, 1931 – Spain
- Lepthyphantes hamifer Simon, 1884 – Palearctic
- Lepthyphantes hirsutus Tanasevitch, 1988 – Russia
- Lepthyphantes hissaricus Tanasevitch, 1989 – Tajikistan
- Lepthyphantes howelli Jocque & Scharff, 1986 – Tanzania
- Lepthyphantes huberti Wunderlich, 1980 – Corsica
- Lepthyphantes hublei Bosmans, 1986 – Cameroon
- Lepthyphantes hummeli Schenkel, 1936 – China
- Lepthyphantes hunanensis Yin, 2012 – China
- Lepthyphantes ibericus Ribera, 1981 – Spain
- Lepthyphantes imazigheni Barrientos, 2020 – Morocco
- Lepthyphantes impudicus Kulczynski, 1909 – Madeira
- Lepthyphantes incertissimus Caporiacco, 1935 – Karakorum
- Lepthyphantes inopinatus Locket, 1968 – Congo
- Lepthyphantes intricatus (Emerton, 1911) – USA, Canada
- Lepthyphantes iranicus Saaristo & Tanasevitch, 1996 – Iran
- Lepthyphantes japonicus Oi, 1960 – Japan
- Lepthyphantes kansuensis Schenkel, 1936 – China
- Lepthyphantes kekenboschi Bosmans, 1979 – Kenya
- Lepthyphantes kenyensis Bosmans, 1979 – Kenya
- Lepthyphantes kilimandjaricus Tullgren, 1910 – Tanzania
- Lepthyphantes kolymensis Tanasevitch & Eskov, 1987 – Russia
- Lepthyphantes kratochvili Fage, 1945 – Crete
- Lepthyphantes lamellatus Barrientos, 2020 – Morocco
- Lepthyphantes latrobei Millidge, 1995 – Krakatau
- Lepthyphantes latus Paik, 1965 – Korea
- Lepthyphantes lebronneci Berland, 1935 – Marquesas Islands
- Lepthyphantes leknizii Barrientos, 2020 – Morocco
- Lepthyphantes leprosus (Ohlert, 1865) – Holarctic, Chile
- Lepthyphantes leucocerus Locket, 1968 – Angola
- Lepthyphantes leucopygius Denis, 1939 – France
- Lepthyphantes ligulifer Denis, 1952 – Romania
- Lepthyphantes lingsoka Tikader, 1970 – India
- Lepthyphantes linzhiensis Hu, 2001 – China
- Lepthyphantes locketi van Helsdingen, 1977 – Angola, Kenya
- Lepthyphantes longihamatus Bosmans, 1985 – Morocco
- Lepthyphantes longipedis Tanasevitch, 2014 − Morocco
- Lepthyphantes louettei Jocque, 1985 – Comoro Islands
- Lepthyphantes lundbladi Schenkel, 1938 – Madeira
- Lepthyphantes luteipes (L. Koch, 1879) – Russia, Kazakhstan, Mongolia, China, Japan
- Lepthyphantes maculatus (Banks, 1900) – USA
- Lepthyphantes maesi Bosmans, 1986 – Cameroon
- Lepthyphantes magnesiae Brignoli, 1979 – Greece
- Lepthyphantes manengoubensis Bosmans, 1986 – Cameroon
- Lepthyphantes mauli Wunderlich, 1992 – Madeira
- Lepthyphantes maurusius Brignoli, 1978 – Morocco
- Lepthyphantes mbaboensis Bosmans, 1986 – Cameroon
- Lepthyphantes meillonae Denis, 1953 – France
- Lepthyphantes messapicus Caporiacco, 1939 – Italy
- Lepthyphantes micromegethes Locket, 1968 – Angola
- Lepthyphantes microserratus Petrunkevitch, 1930 – Puerto Rico
- Lepthyphantes minusculus Locket, 1968 – Congo
- Lepthyphantes minutus (Blackwall, 1833) (type species) – Holarctic
- Lepthyphantes msuyai Scharff, 1990 – Tanzania
- Lepthyphantes natalis Bosmans, 1986 – Cameroon
- Lepthyphantes nenilini Tanasevitch, 1988 – Russia
- Lepthyphantes neocaledonicus Berland, 1924 – New Caledonia
- Lepthyphantes nigridorsus Caporiacco, 1935 – Karakorum
- Lepthyphantes nigropictus Bosmans, 1979 – Kenya
- Lepthyphantes nitidior Simon, 1929 – France
- Lepthyphantes nodifer Simon, 1884 – Europe
- Lepthyphantes noronhensis Rodrigues, Brescovit & Freitas, 2008 – Brazil
- Lepthyphantes notabilis Kulczynski, 1887 – Central Europe
- Lepthyphantes obtusicornis Bosmans, 1979 – Kenya
- Lepthyphantes okuensis Bosmans, 1986 – Cameroon
- Lepthyphantes opilio Simon, 1929 – France
- Lepthyphantes palmeroensis Wunderlich, 1992 – Canary Islands
- Lepthyphantes patulus Locket, 1968 – Angola
- Lepthyphantes pennatus Scharff, 1990 – Tanzania
- Lepthyphantes peramplus (O. Pickard-Cambridge, 1885) − India
- Lepthyphantes perfidus Tanasevitch, 1985 – Central Asia
- Lepthyphantes phallifer Fage, 1931 – Spain
- Lepthyphantes phialoides Scharff, 1990 – Tanzania
- Lepthyphantes pieltaini Machado, 1940 – Morocco
- Lepthyphantes pratorum Caporiacco, 1935 – Karakorum
- Lepthyphantes rainieri Emerton, 1926 – Canada
- Lepthyphantes rimicola Lawrence, 1964 – South Africa
- Lepthyphantes rossitsae Dimitrov, 2018 – Turkey
- Lepthyphantes rubescens Emerton, 1926 – Canada
- Lepthyphantes rudrai Tikader, 1970 – India
- Lepthyphantes ruwenzori Jocque, 1985 – Congo, Uganda
- Lepthyphantes sardous Gozo, 1908 – Sardinia
- Lepthyphantes sasi Barrientos, 2020 – Morocco
- Lepthyphantes saurensis Eskov, 1995 – Kazakhstan
- Lepthyphantes serratus Oi, 1960 – Japan
- Lepthyphantes silvamontanus Bosmans & Jocque, 1983 – Cameroon
- Lepthyphantes simiensis Bosmans, 1978 – Ethiopia
- Lepthyphantes speculae Denis, 1959 – Lebanon
- Lepthyphantes stramineus (O. Pickard-Cambridge, 1885) − India
- Lepthyphantes striatiformis Caporiacco, 1934 – Karakorum
- Lepthyphantes strinatii Hubert, 1970 – Tunisia
- Lepthyphantes styx Wunderlich, 2011 – Canary Islands
- Lepthyphantes subtilis Tanasevitch, 1989 – Kyrgyzstan
- Lepthyphantes tamara Chamberlin & Ivie, 1943 – USA
- Lepthyphantes taza Tanasevitch, 2014 − Morocco
- Lepthyphantes todillus Simon, 1929 – France
- Lepthyphantes trivittatus Caporiacco, 1935 – Karakorum
- Lepthyphantes tropicalis Tullgren, 1910 – Tanzania
- Lepthyphantes tullgreni Bosmans, 1978 – Tanzania
- Lepthyphantes turanicus Tanasevitch & Fet, 1986 – Turkmenistan
- Lepthyphantes turbatrix (O. P.-Cambridge, 1877) – North America, Greenland
- Lepthyphantes ultimus Tanasevitch, 1989 – Tajikistan
- Lepthyphantes umbratilis (Keyserling, 1886) – USA
- Lepthyphantes vanstallei Bosmans, 1986 – Cameroon
- Lepthyphantes venereus Simon, 1913 – Algeria
- Lepthyphantes vividus Denis, 1955 – Lebanon
- Lepthyphantes yueluensis Yin, 2012 – China
- Lepthyphantes yushuensis Hu, 2001 – China
- Lepthyphantes zhangmuensis Hu, 2001 – China

== Leptorhoptrum ==
Leptorhoptrum Kulczynski, 1894

- Leptorhoptrum robustum (Westring, 1851) – Holarctic

== Leptothrix ==
Leptothrix Menge, 1869

- Leptothrix hardyi (Blackwall, 1850) – Palearctic

== Lessertia ==
Lessertia Smith, 1908

- Lessertia barbara (Simon, 1884) – Spain, Morocco, Algeria
- Lessertia dentichelis (Simon, 1884) (type species) – Europe, Canary Islands, Madeira, Canada, New Zealand

== Lessertinella ==
Lessertinella Denis, 1947

- Lessertinella carpatica Weiss, 1979 – Slovakia, Romania
- Lessertinella kulczynskii (Lessert, 1910) (type species) – Switzerland, Germany, Austria, Slovakia, Italy

== Lidia ==
Lidia Saaristo & Marusik, 2004

- Lidia molesta (Tanasevitch, 1989) – Kyrgyzstan
- Lidia tarabaevi Saaristo & Marusik, 2004 (type species) – Kazakhstan

== Limoneta ==
Limoneta Bosmans & Jocque, 1983

- Limoneta graminicola Bosmans & Jocque, 1983 (type species) – Cameroon
- Limoneta sirimoni (Bosmans, 1979) – Kenya, South Africa

== Linyphantes ==
Linyphantes Chamberlin & Ivie, 1942

- Linyphantes aeronauticus (Petrunkevitch, 1929) (type species) – USA
- Linyphantes aliso Chamberlin & Ivie, 1942 – USA
- Linyphantes anacortes Chamberlin & Ivie, 1942 – USA
- Linyphantes delmarus Chamberlin & Ivie, 1942 – USA
- Linyphantes distinctus Chamberlin & Ivie, 1942 – USA
- Linyphantes eureka Chamberlin & Ivie, 1942 – USA
- Linyphantes laguna Chamberlin & Ivie, 1942 – USA
- Linyphantes microps Chamberlin & Ivie, 1942 – USA
- Linyphantes natches Chamberlin & Ivie, 1942 – USA
- Linyphantes nehalem Chamberlin & Ivie, 1942 – USA
- Linyphantes nigrescens Chamberlin & Ivie, 1942 – USA
- Linyphantes obscurus Chamberlin & Ivie, 1942 – USA
- Linyphantes orcinus (Emerton, 1917) – USA, Canada
- Linyphantes pacificus (Banks, 1906) – USA
- Linyphantes pacificus Chamberlin & Ivie, 1942 – USA
- Linyphantes pualla Chamberlin & Ivie, 1942 – USA, Canada
- Linyphantes santinez Chamberlin & Ivie, 1942 – USA
  - Linyphantes santinez verdugo Chamberlin & Ivie, 1942 – USA
- Linyphantes tragicus (Banks, 1898) – Mexico
- Linyphantes victoria Chamberlin & Ivie, 1942 – Canada

== Linyphia ==
Linyphia Latreille, 1804

- Linyphia adstricta (Keyserling, 1886) – USA
- Linyphia albipunctata O. P.-Cambridge, 1885 – Yarkand
- Linyphia alpicola van Helsdingen, 1969 – Central Europe
- Linyphia armata (Keyserling, 1891) – Brazil
- Linyphia bicuspis (F. O. P.-Cambridge, 1902) – Mexico
- Linyphia bifasciata (F. O. P.-Cambridge, 1902) – Costa Rica
- Linyphia bisignata (Banks, 1909) – Costa Rica
- Linyphia calcarifera (Keyserling, 1886) – Panama, Colombia
- Linyphia catalina Gertsch, 1951 – USA
- Linyphia chiapasia Gertsch & Davis, 1946 – Mexico
- Linyphia chiridota (Thorell, 1895) – Myanmar
- Linyphia clara (Keyserling, 1891) – Brazil
- Linyphia confinis O. P.-Cambridge, 1902 – Guatemala
- Linyphia consanguinea O. P.-Cambridge, 1885 – Yarkand
- Linyphia cylindrata (Keyserling, 1891) – Brazil
- Linyphia decorata (Keyserling, 1891) – Brazil
- Linyphia duplicata (F. O. P.-Cambridge, 1902) – Mexico, Guatemala
- Linyphia eiseni Banks, 1898 – Mexico
- Linyphia emertoni Thorell, 1875 – Canada
- Linyphia falculifera (F. O. P.-Cambridge, 1902) – Costa Rica
- Linyphia ferentaria (Keyserling, 1886) – Peru
- Linyphia horaea (Keyserling, 1886) – Colombia
- Linyphia hortensis Sundevall, 1830 – Palearctic
- Linyphia hospita (Keyserling, 1886) – Colombia
- Linyphia hui Hu, 2001 – China
- Linyphia karschi Roewer, 1942 – Sao Tome
- Linyphia lambda (F. O. P.-Cambridge, 1902) – Guatemala
- Linyphia lehmanni Simon, 1903 – Argentina
- Linyphia leucosternon White, 1841 – Brazil
- Linyphia limatula Simon, 1904 – Chile
- Linyphia limbata (F. O. P.-Cambridge, 1902) – Mexico, Guatemala
- Linyphia lineola Pavesi, 1883 – Ethiopia
- Linyphia linguatula (F. O. P.-Cambridge, 1902) – Guatemala
- Linyphia linzhiensis Hu, 2001 – China
- Linyphia longiceps (Keyserling, 1891) – Brazil
- Linyphia longispina (F. O. P.-Cambridge, 1902) – Mexico
- Linyphia ludibunda (Keyserling, 1886) – Peru
- Linyphia lurida (Keyserling, 1886) – Colombia
- Linyphia maculosa (Banks, 1909) – Costa Rica
- Linyphia maura Thorell, 1875 – Western Mediterranean
- Linyphia melanoprocta Mello-Leitao, 1944 – Argentina
- Linyphia menyuanensis Hu, 2001 – China
- Linyphia mimonti Simon, 1884 – Italy, Greece, Lebanon, Israel
- Linyphia monticolens Roewer, 1942 – Peru
- Linyphia neophita Hentz, 1850 – USA
- Linyphia nepalensis Wunderlich, 1983 – Nepal
- Linyphia nigrita (F. O. P.-Cambridge, 1902) – Mexico, Guatemala
- Linyphia nitens Urquhart, 1893 – Tasmania
- Linyphia obesa Thorell, 1875 – Sweden
- Linyphia obscurella Roewer, 1942 – Brazil
- Linyphia octopunctata (Chamberlin & Ivie, 1936) – Panama
- Linyphia oligochronia (Keyserling, 1886) – Peru
- Linyphia orophila Thorell, 1877 – USA
- Linyphia peruana (Keyserling, 1886) – Peru
- Linyphia petrunkevitchi Roewer, 1942 – Guatemala
- Linyphia phaeochorda Rainbow, 1920 – Norfolk Islands
- Linyphia phyllophora Thorell, 1890 – Sumatra
- Linyphia polita Blackwall, 1870 – Sicily
- Linyphia postica (Banks, 1909) – Costa Rica
- Linyphia rita Gertsch, 1951 – USA
- Linyphia rubella Keyserling, 1886 – Peru
- Linyphia rubriceps (Keyserling, 1891) – Brazil
- Linyphia rustica (F. O. P.-Cambridge, 1902) – Mexico
- Linyphia sagana Dönitz & Strand, 1906 – Japan
- Linyphia sikkimensis Tikader, 1970 – India
- Linyphia simplicata (F. O. P.-Cambridge, 1902) – Guatemala
- Linyphia subluteae Urquhart, 1893 – Tasmania
- Linyphia tauphora Chamberlin, 1928 – USA
- Linyphia tenuipalpis Simon, 1884 – Europe to Central Asia, Algeria
- Linyphia textrix Walckenaer, 1841 – USA
- Linyphia triangularis (Clerck, 1757) (type species) – Palearctic, introduced in USA
- Linyphia triangularoides Schenkel, 1936 – China
- Linyphia trifalcata (F. O. P.-Cambridge, 1902) – Guatemala
- Linyphia tuasivia Marples, 1955 – Samoa, Aitutaki
- Linyphia tubernaculofaciens Hingston, 1932 – Guyana
- Linyphia virgata (Keyserling, 1886) – Peru
- Linyphia xilitla Gertsch & Davis, 1946 – Mexico
- Linyphia yangmingensis Yin, 2012 – China

== Locketidium ==
Locketidium Jocque, 1981

- Locketidium bosmansi Jocque, 1981 (type species) – Malawi
- Locketidium couloni Jocque, 1981 – Kenya
- Locketidium stuarti Scharff, 1990 – Tanzania

== Locketiella ==
Locketiella Millidge & Russell-Smith, 1992

- Locketiella merretti Millidge, 1995 – Krakatau
- Locketiella parva Millidge & Russell-Smith, 1992 (type species) – Borneo

== Locketina ==
Locketina Kocak & Kemal, 2006

- Locketina fissivulva (Millidge & Russell-Smith, 1992) – Borneo
- Locketina pusilla (Millidge & Russell-Smith, 1992) – Borneo
- Locketina versa (Locket, 1982) (type species) – Malaysia

== Lomaita ==
Lomaita Bryant, 1948

- Lomaita darlingtoni Bryant, 1948 – Hispaniola

== Lophomma ==
Lophomma Menge, 1868

- Lophomma depressum (Emerton, 1882) – USA
- Lophomma punctatum (Blackwall, 1841) (type species) – Palearctic
- Lophomma vaccinii (Emerton, 1926) – USA, Alaska, Russia

== Lotusiphantes ==
Lotusiphantes Chen & Yin, 2001

- Lotusiphantes nanyuensis Chen & Yin, 2001 – China

== Lucrinus ==
Lucrinus O. P.-Cambridge, 1904

- Lucrinus putus O. P.-Cambridge, 1904 – South Africa

== Lygarina ==
Lygarina Simon, 1894

- Lygarina aurantiaca (Simon, 1905) – Argentina
- Lygarina caracasana Simon, 1894 – Venezuela
- Lygarina finitima Millidge, 1991 – Peru
- Lygarina nitida Simon, 1894 (type species) – Brazil
- Lygarina silvicola Millidge, 1991 – Brazil

== Machadocara ==
Machadocara Miller, 1970

- Machadocara dubia Miller, 1970 – Congo
- Machadocara gongylioides Miller, 1970 (type species) – Zambia

== Macrargus ==
Macrargus Dahl, 1886

- Macrargus boreus Holm, 1968 – Sweden, Finland, Estonia, Russia
- Macrargus carpenteri (O. P.-Cambridge, 1894) – Palearctic
- Macrargus multesimus (O. P.-Cambridge, 1875) – Holarctic
- Macrargus rufus (Wider, 1834) (type species) – Palearctic
- Macrargus sumyensis Gnelitsa & Koponen, 2010 – Ukraine, Belarus

== Maculoncus ==
Maculoncus Wunderlich, 1995

- Maculoncus obscurus Tanasevitch, Ponomarev & Chumachenko, 2016 – Russia (Caucasus)
- Maculoncus orientalis Tanasevitch, 2011 – Taiwan
- Maculoncus parvipalpus Wunderlich, 1995 (type species) – Greece

== Malkinola ==
Malkinola Miller, 2007

- Malkinola insulanus (Millidge, 1991) – Juan Fernandez Islands

== Mansuphantes ==
Mansuphantes Saaristo & Tanasevitch, 1996

- Mansuphantes arciger (Kulczynski, 1882) – Europe
- Mansuphantes aridus (Thorell, 1875) – Switzerland, Austria, Italy
- Mansuphantes auruncus (Brignoli, 1979) – Italy
- Mansuphantes fragilis (Thorell, 1875) – Europe, Turkey
- Mansuphantes korgei (Saaristo & Tanasevitch, 1996) – Turkey
- Mansuphantes mansuetus (Thorell, 1875) (type species) – Palearctic
- Mansuphantes ovalis (Tanasevitch, 1987) – Russia, Georgia, Azerbaijan
- Mansuphantes parmatus (Tanasevitch, 1990) – Russia, Azerbaijan
- Mansuphantes pseudoarciger (Wunderlich, 1985) – France, Switzerland, Italy
- Mansuphantes rectilamellus (Deltshev, 1988) – Bulgaria
- Mansuphantes rossii (Caporiacco, 1927) – Austria, Italy
- Mansuphantes simoni (Kulczynski, 1894) – Western Europe

== Maorineta ==
Maorineta Millidge, 1988

- Maorineta acerba Millidge, 1988 – New Zealand
- Maorineta ambigua Millidge, 1991 – Marshall Islands, Caroline Islands, Cook Islands
- Maorineta gentilis Millidge, 1988 – New Zealand
- Maorineta minor Millidge, 1988 – New Zealand
- Maorineta mollis Millidge, 1988 – New Zealand
- Maorineta sulcata Millidge, 1988 – New Zealand
- Maorineta tibialis Millidge, 1988 (type species) – New Zealand
- Maorineta tumida Millidge, 1988 – New Zealand

== Maro ==
Maro O. P.-Cambridge, 1906

- Maro amplus Dondale & Buckle, 2001 – Canada, USA
- Maro borealis Eskov, 1991 – Russia
- Maro bulbosus Zhao & Li, 2014 − China
- Maro bureensis Tanasevitch, 2006 – Russia
- Maro flavescens (O. P.-Cambridge, 1873) – Russia, Mongolia
- Maro khabarum Tanasevitch, 2006 – Russia
- Maro lautus Saito, 1984 – Russia, Japan
- Maro lehtineni Saaristo, 1971 – Europe
- Maro lepidus Casemir, 1961 – Europe
- Maro minutus O. P.-Cambridge, 1906 (type species) – Palearctic
- Maro nearcticus Dondale & Buckle, 2001 – Canada, USA
- Maro pansibiricus Tanasevitch, 2006 – Russia
- Maro perpusillus Saito, 1984 – Japan
- Maro saaristoi Eskov, 1980 – Russia
- Maro sibiricus Eskov, 1980 – Russia
- Maro sublestus Falconer, 1915 – Palearctic
- Maro ussuricus Tanasevitch, 2006 – Russia

== Martensinus ==
Martensinus Wunderlich, 1973

- Martensinus annulatus Wunderlich, 1973 – Nepal
- Martensinus micronetiformis Wunderlich, 1973 (type species) – Nepal

== Masikia ==
Masikia Millidge, 1984

- Masikia bizinia Nekhaeva, Marusik & Buckle, 2019 – Russia (north-east Siberia)
- Masikia caliginosa Millidge, 1984 – Russia (Europe to Far North-East, Kurile Is.), USA (Alaska)
- Masikia indistincta (Kulczynski, 1908) (type species) – Russia, Alaska, Canada
- Masikia relicta (Chamberlin, 1949) – USA

== Maso ==
Maso Simon, 1884

- Maso alticeps (Emerton, 1909) – USA
- Maso douro Bosmans & Cardoso, 2010 – Portugal
- Maso gallicus Simon, 1894 – Europe, Algeria to Azerbaijan
- Maso krakatauensis Bristowe, 1931 – Krakatau
- Maso navajo Chamberlin, 1949 – USA
- Maso politus Banks, 1896 – USA
- Maso sundevalli (Westring, 1851) (type species) – Holarctic

== Masoncus ==
Masoncus Chamberlin, 1949

- Masoncus arienus Chamberlin, 1949 (type species) – USA
- Masoncus conspectus (Gertsch & Davis, 1936) – USA
- Masoncus dux Chamberlin, 1949 – Canada
- Masoncus pogonophilus Cushing, 1995 – USA

== Masonetta ==
Masonetta Chamberlin & Ivie, 1939

- Masonetta floridana (Ivie & Barrows, 1935) – USA

== Mecopisthes ==
Mecopisthes Simon, 1926

- Mecopisthes alter Thaler, 1991 – Italy
- Mecopisthes crassirostris (Simon, 1884) – Portugal, France
- Mecopisthes daiarum Bosmans, 1993 – Algeria
- Mecopisthes jacquelinae Bosmans, 1993 – Morocco
- Mecopisthes latinus Millidge, 1978 – Switzerland, Italy
- Mecopisthes millidgei Wunderlich, 1995 – Sardinia
- Mecopisthes monticola Bosmans, 1993 – Algeria
- Mecopisthes nasutus Wunderlich, 1995 – Greece
- Mecopisthes nicaeensis (Simon, 1884) – France, Italy
- Mecopisthes orientalis Tanasevitch & Fet, 1986 – Turkmenistan
- Mecopisthes paludicola Bosmans, 1993 – Algeria
- Mecopisthes peuceticus Caporiacco, 1951 – Italy
- Mecopisthes peusi Wunderlich, 1972 – Europe, Israel
- Mecopisthes pictonicus Denis, 1949 – France
- Mecopisthes pumilio Wunderlich, 2008 – Switzerland
- Mecopisthes rhomboidalis Gao, Zhu & Gao, 1993 – China
- Mecopisthes silus (O. P.-Cambridge, 1872) (type species) – Europe, Russia
- Mecopisthes tokumotoi Oi, 1964 – Japan

== Mecynargoides ==
Mecynargoides Eskov, 1988

- Mecynargoides kolymensis Eskov, 1988 – Russia, Mongolia

== Mecynargus ==
Mecynargus Kulczynski, 1894

- Mecynargus asiaticus Tanasevitch, 1989 – Kyrgyzstan
- Mecynargus borealis (Jackson, 1930) – Holarctic
- Mecynargus brocchus (L. Koch, 1872) – Europe
- Mecynargus hypnicola Eskov, 1988 – Russia
- Mecynargus longus (Kulczynski, 1882) (type species) – Eastern Europe
- Mecynargus minutipalpis Gnelitsa, 2011 – Ukraine, Russia
- Mecynargus minutus Tanasevitch, 2013 – Russia
- Mecynargus monticola (Holm, 1943) – Sweden, Finland, Russia, Mongolia, Canada
- Mecynargus morulus (O. P.-Cambridge, 1873) – Greenland, Palearctic
- Mecynargus paetulus (O. P.-Cambridge, 1875) – Holarctic
- Mecynargus pinipumilis Eskov, 1988 – Russia
- Mecynargus pyrenaeus (Denis, 1950) – France
- Mecynargus sphagnicola (Holm, 1939) – Greenland, Scandinavia, Russia, Mongolia, Canada
- Mecynargus tundricola Eskov, 1988 – Russia
- Mecynargus tungusicus (Eskov, 1981) – Russia, Kyrgyzstan, China, Canada

== Mecynidis ==
Mecynidis Simon, 1894

- Mecynidis antiqua Jocque & Scharff, 1986 – Tanzania
- Mecynidis ascia Scharff, 1990 – Tanzania
- Mecynidis bitumida Russell-Smith & Jocque, 1986 – Kenya
- Mecynidis dentipalpis Simon, 1894 (type species) – South Africa
- Mecynidis laevitarsis Miller, 1970 – Angola
- Mecynidis muthaiga Russell-Smith & Jocque, 1986 – Kenya
- Mecynidis scutata Jocque & Scharff, 1986 – Tanzania
- Mecynidis spiralis Jocque & Scharff, 1986 – Tanzania

== Megafroneta ==
Megafroneta Blest, 1979

- Megafroneta dugdaleae Blest & Vink, 2002 – New Zealand
- Megafroneta elongata Blest, 1979 (type species) – New Zealand
- Megafroneta gigas Blest, 1979 – New Zealand

== Megalepthyphantes ==
Megalepthyphantes Wunderlich, 1994

- Megalepthyphantes auresensis Bosmans, 2006 – Algeria
- Megalepthyphantes bkheitae (Bosmans & Bouragba, 1992) – Algeria
- Megalepthyphantes brignolii Tanasevitch, 2014 − Morocco
- Megalepthyphantes camelus (Tanasevitch, 1990) – Iran, Azerbaijan
- Megalepthyphantes collinus (L. Koch, 1872) – Palearctic
- Megalepthyphantes globularis Tanasevitch, 2011 – Turkey
- Megalepthyphantes hellinckxorum Bosmans, 2006 – Algeria
- Megalepthyphantes kandahar Tanasevitch, 2009 – Afghanistan
- Megalepthyphantes kronebergi (Tanasevitch, 1989) – Iran, Kazakhstan to China
- Megalepthyphantes kuhitangensis (Tanasevitch, 1989) – Israel, Central Asia, China
- Megalepthyphantes lydiae Wunderlich, 1994 – Greece
- Megalepthyphantes minotaur Tanasevitch & Wunderlich, 2015 − Crete
- Megalepthyphantes nebulosoides (Wunderlich, 1977) – Iran, Central Asia
- Megalepthyphantes nebulosus (Sundevall, 1830) (type species) – Holarctic
- Megalepthyphantes pseudocollinus Saaristo, 1997 – Europe, Russia, Iran
- Megalepthyphantes turkestanicus (Tanasevitch, 1989) – Turkmenistan, Afghanistan, China
- Megalepthyphantes turkeyensis Tanasevitch, Kunt & Seyyar, 2005 – Cyprus, Turkey

== Mermessus ==
Mermessus O. P.-Cambridge, 1899

- Mermessus agressus (Gertsch & Davis, 1937) – USA, Mexico
- Mermessus albulus (Zorsch & Crosby, 1934) – USA
- Mermessus annamae (Gertsch & Davis, 1937) – Mexico
- Mermessus antraeus (Crosby, 1926) – USA, Mexico
- Mermessus augustae (Crosby & Bishop, 1933) – USA
- Mermessus augustalis (Crosby & Bishop, 1933) – USA, Canada
- Mermessus avius (Millidge, 1987) – Mexico
- Mermessus brevidentatus (Emerton, 1909) – USA
- Mermessus bryantae (Ivie & Barrows, 1935) – North America, Cuba, Venezuela, Azores
- Mermessus caelebs (Millidge, 1987) – Panama, Venezuela
- Mermessus coahuilanus (Gertsch & Davis, 1940) – USA, Mexico
- Mermessus cognatus (Millidge, 1987) – Mexico to Costa Rica
- Mermessus colimus (Millidge, 1987) – Mexico
- Mermessus comes (Millidge, 1987) – Mexico
- Mermessus conexus (Millidge, 1987) – Mexico
- Mermessus conjunctus (Millidge, 1991) – Brazil
- Mermessus contortus (Emerton, 1882) – USA
- Mermessus denticulatus (Banks, 1898) – USA to Colombia (Europe, North Africa, introduced)
- Mermessus dentiger O. P.-Cambridge, 1899 (type species) – USA to Guatemala, Caribbean
- Mermessus dentimandibulatus (Keyserling, 1886) – Colombia, Peru
- Mermessus dominicus (Millidge, 1987) – Dominica
- Mermessus dopainus (Chamberlin & Ivie, 1936) – Mexico
- Mermessus entomologicus (Emerton, 1911) – USA, Canada
- Mermessus estrellae (Millidge, 1987) – Mexico
- Mermessus facetus (Millidge, 1987) – Costa Rica
- Mermessus floridus (Millidge, 1987) – USA
- Mermessus formosus (Millidge, 1987) – Mexico
- Mermessus fractus (Millidge, 1987) – Costa Rica
- Mermessus fradeorum (Berland, 1932) – Cosmopolitan
- Mermessus fuscus (Millidge, 1987) – Mexico
- Mermessus hebes (Millidge, 1991) – Venezuela
- Mermessus holdus (Chamberlin & Ivie, 1939) – USA, Canada
- Mermessus hospita (Millidge, 1987) – Mexico
- Mermessus ignobilis (Millidge, 1987) – Mexico
- Mermessus imago (Millidge, 1987) – Mexico
- Mermessus index (Emerton, 1914) – USA, Canada
- Mermessus indicabilis (Crosby & Bishop, 1928) – USA
- Mermessus inornatus (Ivie & Barrows, 1935) – USA
- Mermessus insulsus (Millidge, 1991) – Peru
- Mermessus jona (Bishop & Crosby, 1938) – USA, Canada
- Mermessus leoninus (Millidge, 1987) – Mexico
- Mermessus libanus (Millidge, 1987) – Mexico
- Mermessus lindrothi (Holm, 1960) – Alaska
- Mermessus maculatus (Banks, 1892) – Russia, Canada to Guatemala
- Mermessus maderus (Millidge, 1987) – USA
- Mermessus major (Millidge, 1987) – USA
- Mermessus mediocris (Millidge, 1987) – USA, Canada
- Mermessus medius (Millidge, 1987) – Mexico
- Mermessus merus (Millidge, 1987) – Mexico
- Mermessus mniarus (Crosby & Bishop, 1928) – USA
- Mermessus modicus (Millidge, 1987) – USA
- Mermessus montanus (Millidge, 1987) – Mexico
- Mermessus monticola (Millidge, 1987) – Mexico
- Mermessus moratus (Millidge, 1987) – Mexico
- Mermessus naniwaensis (Oi, 1960) – China, Japan
- Mermessus nigrus (Millidge, 1991) – Colombia
- Mermessus obscurus (Millidge, 1991) – Colombia
- Mermessus orbus (Millidge, 1987) – Mexico
- Mermessus ornatus (Millidge, 1987) – Mexico
- Mermessus paludosus (Millidge, 1987) – Canada
- Mermessus paulus (Millidge, 1987) – USA
- Mermessus perplexus (Millidge, 1987) – Mexico
- Mermessus persimilis (Millidge, 1987) – Mexico
- Mermessus pinicola (Millidge, 1987) – Mexico
- Mermessus probus (Millidge, 1987) – Mexico
- Mermessus proximus (Keyserling, 1886) – Peru
- Mermessus rapidulus (Bishop & Crosby, 1938) – Nicaragua, Costa Rica, Panama
- Mermessus singularis (Millidge, 1987) – Mexico
- Mermessus socius (Chamberlin, 1949) – USA
- Mermessus sodalis (Millidge, 1987) – USA
- Mermessus solitus (Millidge, 1987) – USA
- Mermessus solus (Millidge, 1987) – Mexico
- Mermessus subantillanus (Millidge, 1987) – Guadeloupe
- Mermessus taibo (Chamberlin & Ivie, 1933) – USA, Canada
- Mermessus tenuipalpis (Emerton, 1911) – USA
- Mermessus tepejicanus (Gertsch & Davis, 1937) – Mexico
- Mermessus tibialis (Millidge, 1987) – USA
- Mermessus tlaxcalanus (Gertsch & Davis, 1937) – Mexico
- Mermessus tridentatus (Emerton, 1882) – USA, Canada, Puerto Rico
- Mermessus trilobatus (Emerton, 1882) – Holarctic
- Mermessus undulatus (Emerton, 1914) – USA, Canada

== Mesasigone ==
Mesasigone Tanasevitch, 1989

- Mesasigone mira Tanasevitch, 1989 – Russia, Iran, Kazakhstan to China

== Metafroneta ==
Metafroneta Blest, 1979

- Metafroneta minima Blest, 1979 – New Zealand
- Metafroneta sinuosa Blest, 1979 (type species) – New Zealand
- Metafroneta subversa Blest & Vink, 2002 – New Zealand

== Metaleptyphantes ==
Metaleptyphantes Locket, 1968

- Metaleptyphantes bifoliatus Locket, 1968 – Angola
- Metaleptyphantes cameroonensis Bosmans, 1986 – Cameroon
- Metaleptyphantes carinatus Locket, 1968 – Angola
- Metaleptyphantes clavator Locket, 1968 – Congo, Angola, Kenya, Tanzania
- Metaleptyphantes dentiferens Bosmans, 1979 – Kenya
- Metaleptyphantes dubius Locket & Russell-Smith, 1980 – Nigeria
- Metaleptyphantes familiaris Jocque, 1984 – South Africa
- Metaleptyphantes foulfouldei Bosmans, 1986 – Cameroon
- Metaleptyphantes kraepelini (Simon, 1905) – Java
- Metaleptyphantes machadoi Locket, 1968 (type species) – Cameroon, Nigeria, Gabon, Angola, Uganda, Tanzania
- Metaleptyphantes ovatus Scharff, 1990 – Tanzania
- Metaleptyphantes perexiguus (Simon & Fage, 1922) – Africa, Comoro Islands
- Metaleptyphantes praecipuus Locket, 1968 – Angola, Seychelles
- Metaleptyphantes triangulatus Holm, 1968 – Congo
- Metaleptyphantes uncinatus Holm, 1968 – Congo
- Metaleptyphantes vates Jocque, 1983 – Gabon
- Metaleptyphantes vicinus Locket, 1968 – Angola

== Metamynoglenes ==
Metamynoglenes Blest, 1979

- Metamynoglenes absurda Blest & Vink, 2002 – New Zealand
- Metamynoglenes attenuata Blest, 1979 – New Zealand
- Metamynoglenes flagellata Blest, 1979 – New Zealand
- Metamynoglenes gracilis Blest, 1979 – New Zealand
- Metamynoglenes helicoides Blest, 1979 – New Zealand
- Metamynoglenes incurvata Blest, 1979 (type species) – New Zealand
- Metamynoglenes magna Blest, 1979 – New Zealand
- Metamynoglenes ngongotaha Blest & Vink, 2002 – New Zealand

== Metapanamomops ==
Metapanamomops Millidge, 1977

- Metapanamomops kaestneri (Wiehle, 1961) – Germany to Ukraine

== Metopobactrus ==
Metopobactrus Simon, 1884

- Metopobactrus ascitus (Kulczynski, 1894) – Eastern Europe
- Metopobactrus cavernicola Wunderlich, 1992 – Canary Islands
- Metopobactrus deserticola Loksa, 1981 – Hungary
- Metopobactrus falcifrons Simon, 1884 (type species) – France
- Metopobactrus nadigi Thaler, 1976 – Switzerland, Austria, Italy
- Metopobactrus nodicornis Schenkel, 1927 – Switzerland, Austria
- Metopobactrus orbelicus Deltshev, 1985 – Bulgaria
- Metopobactrus pacificus Emerton, 1923 – USA
- Metopobactrus prominulus (O. P.-Cambridge, 1872) – Holarctic
- Metopobactrus verticalis (Simon, 1881) – France, Corsica

== Micrargus ==
Micrargus Dahl, 1886

- Micrargus aleuticus Holm, 1960 – Alaska
- Micrargus alpinus Relys & Weiss, 1997 – Germany, Switzerland, Austria
- Micrargus apertus (O. P.-Cambridge, 1871) – Palearctic
- Micrargus cavernicola Wunderlich, 1995 – Japan
- Micrargus cupidon (Simon, 1913) – France
- Micrargus dilutus (Denis, 1948) – France
- Micrargus dissimilis Denis, 1950 – France
- Micrargus fuscipalpis (Denis, 1962) −Uganda
- Micrargus georgescuae Millidge, 1976 – Europe
- Micrargus herbigradus (Blackwall, 1854) (type species) – Palearctic
- Micrargus hokkaidoensis Wunderlich, 1995 – Japan
- Micrargus laudatus (O. P.-Cambridge, 1881) – Europe
- Micrargus longitarsus (Emerton, 1882) – USA, Canada
- Micrargus nibeoventris (Komatsu, 1942) – Japan
- Micrargus parvus Wunderlich, 2011 – Canary Islands
- Micrargus pervicax (Denis, 1947) – France, possibly Austria
- Micrargus subaequalis (Westring, 1851) – Palearctic

== Microbathyphantes ==
Microbathyphantes van Helsdingen, 1985

- Microbathyphantes aokii (Saito, 1982) – China, Vietnam, Japan
- Microbathyphantes celebes Tanasevitch, 2012 – Sulawesi
- Microbathyphantes palmarius (Marples, 1955) (type species) – Sri Lanka, India, Seychelles, Myanmar, Polynesia
- Microbathyphantes spedani (Locket, 1968) – Cameroon, Nigeria, Angola
- Microbathyphantes tateyamaensis (Oi, 1960) – Japan

== Microctenonyx ==
Microctenonyx Dahl, 1886

- Microctenonyx apuliae (Caporiacco, 1951) – Italy
- Microctenonyx cavifrons (Caporiacco, 1935) – Karakorum
- Microctenonyx evansae (Locket & Russell-Smith, 1980) – Nigeria
- Microctenonyx subitaneus (O. P.-Cambridge, 1875) (type species) – Holarctic (elsewhere, introduced)

== Microcyba ==
Microcyba Holm, 1962

- Microcyba aculeata Holm, 1964 – Congo
- Microcyba affinis Holm, 1962 – Uganda
- Microcyba angulata Holm, 1962 – Kenya, Uganda
- Microcyba brevidentata Holm, 1962 – Tanzania
- Microcyba calida Jocque, 1983 – Gabon
- Microcyba cameroonensis Bosmans, 1988 – Cameroon
- Microcyba divisa Jocque, 1983 – Gabon
- Microcyba erecta Holm, 1962 – Uganda
- Microcyba falcata Holm, 1962 (type species) – Uganda
- Microcyba hamata Holm, 1962 – Kenya, Uganda
- Microcyba hedbergi Holm, 1962 – Uganda
- Microcyba leleupi Holm, 1968 – Congo
- Microcyba projecta Holm, 1962 – Uganda
- Microcyba simulata Holm, 1962 – Kenya
- Microcyba tridentata Holm, 1962 – Kenya, Uganda
- Microcyba vancotthemi Bosmans, 1977 – Kenya
- Microcyba viduata Holm, 1962 – Kenya
- Microcyba vilhenai Miller, 1970 – Congo

== Microlinyphia ==
Microlinyphia Gerhardt, 1928

- Microlinyphia aethiopica (Tullgren, 1910) – East Africa
- Microlinyphia cylindriformis Jocque, 1985 – Comoro Islands
- Microlinyphia dana (Chamberlin & Ivie, 1943) – USA, Canada, Alaska
- Microlinyphia delesserti (Caporiacco, 1949) – Tanzania, Uganda, Congo
- Microlinyphia impigra (O. P.-Cambridge, 1871) – Holarctic
- Microlinyphia johnsoni (Blackwall, 1859) – Madeira, Canary Islands
- Microlinyphia mandibulata (Emerton, 1882) – USA
  - Microlinyphia mandibulata punctata (Chamberlin & Ivie, 1943) – USA, Canada
- Microlinyphia pusilla (Sundevall, 1830) (type species) – Holarctic
  - Microlinyphia pusilla quadripunctata (Strand, 1903) – Norway
- Microlinyphia simoni van Helsdingen, 1970 – Madagascar
- Microlinyphia sterilis (Pavesi, 1883) – Central, East, Southern Africa; China
- Microlinyphia zhejiangensis (Chen, 1991) – China

== Microneta ==
Microneta Menge, 1869

- Microneta caestata (Thorell, 1875) – Sweden
- Microneta disceptra Crosby & Bishop, 1929 – Peru
- Microneta flaveola Banks, 1892 – USA
- Microneta formicaria Balogh, 1938 – New Guinea
- Microneta inops (Thorell, 1875) – Sweden
- Microneta orines Chamberlin & Ivie, 1933 – USA
- Microneta semiatra (Keyserling, 1886) – Brazil
- Microneta sima Chamberlin & Ivie, 1936 – Mexico
- Microneta varia Simon, 1897 – St. Vincent
- Microneta viaria (Blackwall, 1841) (type species) – Holarctic
- Microneta watona Chamberlin & Ivie, 1936 – Mexico

== Microplanus ==
Microplanus Millidge, 1991

- Microplanus mollis Millidge, 1991 (type species) – Colombia
- Microplanus odin Miller, 2007 – Panama

== Midia ==
Midia Saaristo & Wunderlich, 1995

- Midia midas (Simon, 1884) – Europe

== Miftengris ==
Miftengris Eskov, 1993

- Miftengris scutumatus Eskov, 1993 – Russia

== Millidgea ==
Millidgea Locket, 1968

- Millidgea convoluta Locket, 1968 (type species) – Angola
- Millidgea navicula Locket, 1968 – Angola
- Millidgea verrucosa Locket, 1968 – Angola

== Millidgella ==
Millidgella Kammerer, 2006

- Millidgella trisetosa (Millidge, 1985) – Chile, Argentina

== Minicia ==
Minicia Thorell, 1875

- Minicia alticola Tanasevitch, 1990 – Georgia
- Minicia candida Denis, 1946 – Europe
  - Minicia candida obscurior Denis, 1963 – France
- Minicia caspiana Tanasevitch, 1990 – Azerbaijan
- Minicia elegans Simon, 1894 – Portugal, Algeria
- Minicia floresensis Wunderlich, 1992 – Azores
- Minicia gomerae (Schmidt, 1975) – Canary Islands
- Minicia grancanariensis Wunderlich, 1987 – Canary Islands
- Minicia kirghizica Tanasevitch, 1985 – Central Asia
- Minicia marginella (Wider, 1834) (type species) – Palearctic
- Minicia pallida Eskov, 1995 – Russia, Kazakhstan
- Minicia teneriffensis Wunderlich, 1979 – Canary Islands
- Minicia vittata Caporiacco, 1935 – Kashmir

== Minyriolus ==
Minyriolus Simon, 1884

- Minyriolus australis Simon, 1902 – Argentina
- Minyriolus medusa (Simon, 1881) – Europe
- Minyriolus phaulobius (Thorell, 1875) – Italy
- Minyriolus pusillus (Wider, 1834) (type species) – Palearctic

== Mioxena ==
Mioxena Simon, 1926

- Mioxena blanda (Simon, 1884) (type species) – Europe, Russia
- Mioxena celisi Holm, 1968 – Congo, Kenya
- Mioxena longispinosa Miller, 1970 – Angola

== Mitrager ==
Mitrager van Helsdingen, 1985

- Mitrager noordami van Helsdingen, 1985 – Java

== Moebelia ==
Moebelia Dahl, 1886

- Moebelia berolinensis (Wunderlich, 1969) – Germany
- Moebelia penicillata (Westring, 1851) (type species) – Palearctic
- Moebelia rectangula Song & Li, 2007 – China

== Moebelotinus ==
Moebelotinus Wunderlich, 1995

- Moebelotinus transbaikalicus (Eskov, 1989) – Russia, Mongolia

== Molestia ==
Molestia Tu, Saaristo & Li, 2006

- Molestia molesta (Tao, Li & Zhu, 1995) – China

== Monocephalus ==
Monocephalus Smith, 1906

- Monocephalus castaneipes (Simon, 1884) – Europe
- Monocephalus fuscipes (Blackwall, 1836) (type species) – Europe

== Monocerellus ==
Monocerellus Tanasevitch, 1983

- Monocerellus montanus Tanasevitch, 1983 – Russia

== Montilaira ==
Montilaira Chamberlin, 1921

- Montilaira uta (Chamberlin, 1919) – USA

== Moreiraxena ==
Moreiraxena Miller, 1970

- Moreiraxena chicapensis Miller, 1970 – Angola

== Moyosi ==
Moyosi Miller, 2007

- Moyosi chumota Miller, 2007 – Guyana
- Moyosi prativaga (Keyserling, 1886) (type species) – Brazil, Argentina
- Moyosi rugosa (Millidge, 1991) – Argentina

== Mughiphantes ==
Mughiphantes Saaristo & Tanasevitch, 1999

- Mughiphantes aculifer (Tanasevitch, 1988) – Russia
- Mughiphantes afghanus (Denis, 1958) – Afghanistan
- Mughiphantes alticola (Tanasevitch, 1987) – Nepal
- Mughiphantes anachoretus (Tanasevitch, 1987) – Nepal
- Mughiphantes ancoriformis (Tanasevitch, 1987) – Nepal
- Mughiphantes arlaudi (Denis, 1954) – France
- Mughiphantes armatus (Kulczynski, 1905) – Central Europe
- Mughiphantes baebleri (Lessert, 1910) – Central Europe
- Mughiphantes beishanensis Tanasevitch, 2006 – China
- Mughiphantes bicornis Tanasevitch & Saaristo, 2006 – Nepal
- Mughiphantes brunneri (Thaler, 1984) – Italy
- Mughiphantes carnicus (van Helsdingen, 1982) – Italy
- Mughiphantes cornutus (Schenkel, 1927) – Palearctic
- Mughiphantes cuspidatus Tanasevitch & Saaristo, 2006 – Nepal
- Mughiphantes edentulus Tanasevitch, 2010 – UAE
- Mughiphantes falxus Tanasevitch & Saaristo, 2006 – Nepal
- Mughiphantes faustus (Tanasevitch, 1987) – Nepal
- Mughiphantes hadzii (Miller & Polenec, 1975) – Slovenia
- Mughiphantes handschini (Schenkel, 1919) – Central Europe
- Mughiphantes hindukuschensis (Miller & Buchar, 1972) – Afghanistan
- Mughiphantes ignavus (Simon, 1884) – France
- Mughiphantes inermus Tanasevitch & Saaristo, 2006 – Nepal
- Mughiphantes jaegeri Tanasevitch, 2006 – China
- Mughiphantes johannislupi (Denis, 1953) – France
- Mughiphantes jugorum (Denis, 1954) – France
- Mughiphantes lithoclasicola (Deltshev, 1983) – Bulgaria
- Mughiphantes logunovi Tanasevitch, 2000 – Russia
- Mughiphantes longiproper Tanasevitch & Saaristo, 2006 – Nepal
- Mughiphantes martensi Tanasevitch, 2006 – China
- Mughiphantes marusiki (Tanasevitch, 1988) – Russia, Mongolia
- Mughiphantes merretti (Millidge, 1975) – Italy
- Mughiphantes mughi (Fickert, 1875) (type species) – Europe, Russia
- Mughiphantes nigromaculatus (Zhu & Wen, 1983) – Russia, China
- Mughiphantes numilionis (Tanasevitch, 1987) – Nepal
- Mughiphantes occultus (Tanasevitch, 1987) – Nepal
- Mughiphantes omega (Denis, 1952) – Romania
- Mughiphantes ovtchinnikovi (Tanasevitch, 1989) – Kyrgyzstan
- Mughiphantes pulcher (Kulczynski, 1881) – Central Europe
- Mughiphantes pulcheroides (Wunderlich, 1985) – Italy
- Mughiphantes pyrenaeus (Denis, 1953) – France
- Mughiphantes restrictus Tanasevitch & Saaristo, 2006 – Nepal
- Mughiphantes rotundatus (Tanasevitch, 1987) – Nepal
- Mughiphantes rupium (Thaler, 1984) – Germany, Austria
- Mughiphantes setifer (Tanasevitch, 1987) – Nepal
- Mughiphantes setosus Tanasevitch & Saaristo, 2006 – Nepal
- Mughiphantes severus (Thaler, 1990) – Austria
- Mughiphantes sherpa (Tanasevitch, 1987) – Nepal
- Mughiphantes sobrioides Tanasevitch, 2000 – Russia
- Mughiphantes sobrius (Thorell, 1871) – Norway, Russia
- Mughiphantes styriacus (Thaler, 1984) – Austria
- Mughiphantes suffusus (Strand, 1901) – Scandinavia, Russia
- Mughiphantes taczanowskii (O. P.-Cambridge, 1873) – Russia, Mongolia
- Mughiphantes tienschangensis (Tanasevitch, 1986) – Central Asia
- Mughiphantes triglavensis (Miller & Polenec, 1975) – Austria, Slovenia
- Mughiphantes variabilis (Kulczynski, 1887) – Central Europe
- Mughiphantes varians (Kulczynski, 1882) – Eastern Europe
- Mughiphantes vittatus (Spassky, 1941) – Central Asia
- Mughiphantes whymperi (F. O. P.-Cambridge, 1894) – Ireland, Britain, Finland, Russia
- Mughiphantes yadongensis (Hu, 2001) – China
- Mughiphantes yeti (Tanasevitch, 1987) – Nepal

== Murphydium ==
Murphydium Jocque, 1996

- Murphydium foliatum Jocque, 1996 – Kenya, Somalia

== Mycula ==
Mycula Schikora, 1994

- Mycula mossakowskii Schikora, 1994 – Germany, Austria, Italy

== Myrmecomelix ==
Myrmecomelix Millidge, 1993

- Myrmecomelix leucippus Miller, 2007 – Peru
- Myrmecomelix pulcher (Millidge, 1991) (type species) – Ecuador, Peru

== Mythoplastoides ==
Mythoplastoides Crosby & Bishop, 1933

- Mythoplastoides erectus (Emerton, 1915) – USA
- Mythoplastoides exiguus (Banks, 1892) (type species) – USA

== Napometa ==
Napometa Benoit, 1977

- Napometa sanctaehelenae Benoit, 1977 (type species) – St. Helena
- Napometa trifididens (O. P.-Cambridge, 1873) – St. Helena

== Nasoona ==
Nasoona Locket, 1982

- Nasoona asocialis (Wunderlich, 1974) – China, Nepal, India, Laos, Thailand, Malaysia
- Nasoona chrysanthusi Locket, 1982 – Malaysia, Singapore
- Nasoona comata (Tanasevitch, 1998) – Nepal
- Nasoona conica (Tanasevitch, 1998) – Nepal
- Nasoona coronata (Simon, 1894) – Venezuela
- Nasoona crucifera (Thorell, 1895) – China, Myanmar, Thailand, Vietnam, Laos, Malaysia
- Nasoona indiana Tanasevitch, 2018 – India
- Nasoona intuberosa Tanasevitch, 2018 – Malaysia (Borneo)
- Nasoona kinabalu Tanasevitch, 2018 – Malaysia (Borneo)
- Nasoona locketi Millidge, 1995 – Krakatau
- Nasoona orissa Tanasevitch, 2018 – India, Sri Lanka
- Nasoona nigromaculata Gao, Fei & Xing, 1996 – China
- Nasoona prominula Locket, 1982^{T} (type species) – Malaysia
- Nasoona sabah Tanasevitch, 2018 – Malaysia (Borneo)
- Nasoona setifera (Tanasevitch, 1998) – Nepal
- Nasoona silvestris Millidge, 1995 – Indonesia
- Nasoona wunderlichi (Brignoli, 1983) – Nepal

== Nasoonaria ==
Nasoonaria Wunderlich & Song, 1995

- Nasoonaria mada Tanasevitch, 2018 − Vietnam
- Nasoonaria magna Tanasevitch, 2014 − China, Thailand
- Nasoonaria pseudoembolica Tanasevitch, 2019 − Vietnam
- Nasoonaria sinensis Wunderlich & Song, 1995 (type species) – China

== Nematogmus ==
Nematogmus Simon, 1884

- Nematogmus asiaticus Tanasevitch, 2014 – Laos, Thailand
- Nematogmus dentimanus Simon, 1886 – Sri Lanka to Malaysia, Java, Krakatau
- Nematogmus digitatus Fei & Zhu, 1994 – China
- Nematogmus longior Song & Li, 2008 – China
- Nematogmus membranifer Song & Li, 2008 – China
- Nematogmus nigripes Hu, 2001 – China
- Nematogmus rutilis Oi, 1960 – Japan
- Nematogmus sanguinolentus (Walckenaer, 1841) (type species) – Palearctic
- Nematogmus stylitus (Bösenberg & Strand, 1906) – China, Japan

== Nenilinium ==
Nenilinium Eskov, 1988

- Nenilinium asiaticum Eskov, 1988 (type species) – Russia
- Nenilinium luteolum (Loksa, 1965) – Russia, Mongolia

== Nentwigia ==
Nentwigia Millidge, 1995

- Nentwigia diffusa Millidge, 1995 – Thailand, Krakatau

== Neocautinella ==
Neocautinella Baert, 1990

- Neocautinella neoterica (Keyserling, 1886) – Ecuador, Peru, Bolivia, Galapagos Islands

== Neodietrichia ==
Neodietrichia Özdikmen, 2008

- Neodietrichia hesperia (Crosby & Bishop, 1933) – USA, Canada

== Neoeburnella ==
Neoeburnella Kocak, 1986

- Neoeburnella avocalis (Jocque & Bosmans, 1983) – Ivory Coast

== Neomaso ==
Neomaso Forster, 1970

- Neomaso abnormis Millidge, 1991 – Chile
- Neomaso aequabilis Millidge, 1991 – Argentina
- Neomaso angusticeps Millidge, 1985 – Chile
- Neomaso antarcticus (Hickman, 1939) – Kerguelen, Marion Islands
- Neomaso articeps Millidge, 1991 – Chile
- Neomaso arundicola Millidge, 1991 – Brazil
- Neomaso bilobatus (Tullgren, 1901) – Chile
- Neomaso claggi Forster, 1970 (type species) – Chile, South Georgia
- Neomaso damocles Miller, 2007 – Brazil, Argentina
- Neomaso fagicola Millidge, 1985 – Chile
- Neomaso fluminensis Millidge, 1991 – Chile
- Neomaso insperatus Millidge, 1991 – Argentina
- Neomaso insulanus Millidge, 1991 – Juan Fernandez Islands
- Neomaso minimus Millidge, 1985 – Chile
- Neomaso parvus Millidge, 1985 – Chile
- Neomaso patagonicus (Tullgren, 1901) – Chile, Argentina
- Neomaso peltatus Millidge, 1985 – Chile
- Neomaso pollicatus (Tullgren, 1901) – Chile, Argentina, Falkland Islands
- Neomaso scutatus Millidge, 1985 – Chile
- Neomaso setiger Millidge, 1991 – Chile
- Neomaso vicinus Millidge, 1991 – Argentina

== Neonesiotes ==
Neonesiotes Millidge, 1991

- Neonesiotes hamatus Millidge, 1991 – Caroline Islands
- Neonesiotes remiformis Millidge, 1991 (type species) – Seychelles, Marshall Islands, Caroline Islands, Cook Islands, Fiji, Samoa

== Neriene ==
Neriene Blackwall, 1833

- Neriene albolimbata (Karsch, 1879) – Russia (Far East), China, Korea, Taiwan, Japan
- Neriene amiculata (Simon, 1905) – Java
- Neriene angulifera (Schenkel, 1953) – Russia (Far East), China, Japan
- Neriene aquilirostralis Chen & Zhu, 1989 – China
- Neriene bayawanga (Barrion & Litsinger, 1995) – Philippines
- Neriene beccarii (Thorell, 1890) – Sumatra
- Neriene birmanica (Thorell, 1887) – India, Myanmar, Laos, China, Indonesia (Bali)
- Neriene brongersmai van Helsdingen, 1969 – Japan
- Neriene calozonata Chen & Zhu, 1989 – China
- Neriene cavaleriei (Schenkel, 1963) – China, Vietnam
- Neriene chunan Yin, 2012 – Chunan
- Neriene circifolia Zhao & Li, 2014 – China
- Neriene clathrata (Sundevall, 1830) (type species) – North America, Europe, North Africa, Caucasus, Russia (Europe to Far East), Iran, Central Asia, China, Korea, Japan
- Neriene comoroensis Locket, 1980 – Comoros
- Neriene compta Zhu & Sha, 1986 – China
- Neriene conica (Locket, 1968) – Angola, Rwanda, Kenya
- Neriene coosa (Gertsch, 1951) – Russia (Sakhalin), USA
- Neriene decormaculata Chen & Zhu, 1988 – China
- Neriene digna (Keyserling, 1886) – USA, Canada
- Neriene emphana (Walckenaer, 1842) – Europe, Caucasus, Russia (Europe to Far East), Central Asia, China, Korea, Japan
- Neriene flammea van Helsdingen, 1969 – South Africa
- Neriene furtiva (O. P.-Cambridge, 1871) – Europe, North Africa, Russia (Europe to South Siberia)
- Neriene fusca (Oi, 1960) – Japan
- Neriene guanga (Barrion & Litsinger, 1995) – Philippines
- Neriene gyirongana Hu, 2001 – China
- Neriene hammeni (van Helsdingen, 1963) – Netherlands, Belgium, France, Germany, China?
- Neriene helsdingeni (Locket, 1968) – Africa
- Neriene herbosa (Oi, 1960) – China, Japan
- Neriene japonica (Oi, 1960) – Russia (Far East), China, Korea, Japan
- Neriene jinjooensis Paik, 1991 – China, Korea, Japan
- Neriene kartala Jocqué, 1985 – Comoros
- Neriene katyae van Helsdingen, 1969 – Sri Lanka
- Neriene kibonotensis (Tullgren, 1910) – West, Central, East Africa
- Neriene kimyongkii (Paik, 1965) – Korea
- Neriene limbatinella (Bösenberg & Strand, 1906) – Russia (Far East), China, Korea, Japan
- Neriene litigiosa (Keyserling, 1886) – North America. Introduced to China
- Neriene longipedella (Bösenberg & Strand, 1906) – Russia (Far East), China, Korea, Japan
- Neriene lushanensis Li, Liu & Chen, 2018 – China
- Neriene macella (Thorell, 1898) – India, China, Myanmar, Thailand, Laos, Malaysia (peninsula), Indonesia (Sumatra, Java), Philippines
- Neriene marginella (Oi, 1960) – Japan
- Neriene montana (Clerck, 1757) – Europe, Caucasus, Russia (Europe to Far East), Central Asia, Japan
- Neriene natalensis van Helsdingen, 1969 – South Africa
- Neriene nitens Zhu & Chen, 1991 – China
- Neriene obtusa (Locket, 1968) – Africa
- Neriene obtusoides Bosmans & Jocqué, 1983 – Cameroon
- Neriene oidedicata van Helsdingen, 1969 – Russia (Far East), China, Korea, Japan
- Neriene orthocera Li, Liu & Chen, 2018 – China
- Neriene oxycera Tu & Li, 2006 – Laos, Thailand, Vietnam
- Neriene peltata (Wider, 1834) – Greenland, Europe, Caucasus, Russia (Europe to South Siberia), Iran
- Neriene poculiforma Liu & Chen, 2010 – China
- Neriene radiata (Walckenaer, 1842) – North America, Europe, Turkey, Caucasus, Russia (Europe to Far East), Kazakhstan, China, Korea, Japan
- Neriene redacta Chamberlin, 1925 – USA
- Neriene strandia (Blauvelt, 1936) – China, Borneo
- Neriene subarctica Marusik, 1991 – Russia (Middle Siberia to Far East)
- Neriene sundaica (Simon, 1905) – Indonesia (Java, Lombok)
- Neriene tiniktirika (Barrion & Litsinger, 1995) – Philippines
- Neriene variabilis (Banks, 1892) – USA
- Neriene yani Chen & Yin, 1999 – China
- Neriene zanhuangica Zhu & Tu, 1986 – China
- Neriene zhui Chen & Li, 1995 – China (Hainan)

== Neserigone ==
Neserigone Eskov, 1992

- Neserigone basarukini Eskov, 1992 (type species) – Russia, Japan
- Neserigone nigriterminorum (Oi, 1960) – Japan
- Neserigone torquipalpis (Oi, 1960) – Japan

== Nesioneta ==
Nesioneta Millidge, 1991

- Nesioneta arabica Tanasevitch, 2010 – UAE
- Nesioneta benoiti (van Helsdingen, 1978) – Sri Lanka, Seychelles
- Nesioneta elegans Millidge, 1991 – Caroline Islands, Fiji
- Nesioneta ellipsoidalis Tu & Li, 2006 – Vietnam
- Nesioneta lepida Millidge, 1991 (type species) – Marshall Islands, Caroline Islands, Hawaii
- Nesioneta muriensis (Wunderlich, 1983) – Nepal
- Nesioneta pacificana (Berland, 1935) – Pacific Islands
- Nesioneta similis Millidge, 1991 – Caroline Islands
- Nesioneta sola (Millidge & Russell-Smith, 1992) – Sulawesi

== Nippononeta ==
Nippononeta Eskov, 1992

- Nippononeta alpina (Li & Zhu, 1993) – Japan
- Nippononeta bursa Yin, 2012 – China
- Nippononeta cheunghensis (Paik, 1978) – Korea
- Nippononeta coreana (Paik, 1991) – China, Korea
- Nippononeta elongata Ono & Saito, 2001 – Japan
- Nippononeta embolica Tanasevitch, 2005 – Russia
- Nippononeta kaiensis Ono & Saito, 2001 – Japan
- Nippononeta kantonis Ono & Saito, 2001 – Japan
- Nippononeta kurilensis Eskov, 1992 (type species) – Russia, Japan
- Nippononeta masatakana Ono & Saito, 2001 – Japan
- Nippononeta masudai Ono & Saito, 2001 – Japan
- Nippononeta minuta (Oi, 1960) – Japan
- Nippononeta nodosa (Oi, 1960) – Japan
- Nippononeta obliqua (Oi, 1960) – Korea, Japan
- Nippononeta ogatai Ono & Saito, 2001 – Japan
- Nippononeta okumae Ono & Saito, 2001 – Japan
- Nippononeta onoi Bao, Bai & Tu, 2017 − Japan
- Nippononeta pentagona (Oi, 1960) – Mongolia, Japan
- Nippononeta projecta (Oi, 1960) – Mongolia, Korea, Japan
- Nippononeta silvicola Ono & Saito, 2001 – Japan
- Nippononeta sinica Tanasevitch, 2006 – China
- Nippononeta subnigra Ono & Saito, 2001 – Japan
- Nippononeta ungulata (Oi, 1960) – Korea, Japan
- Nippononeta xiphoidea Ono & Saito, 2001 – Japan

== Nipponotusukuru ==
Nipponotusukuru Saito & Ono, 2001

- Nipponotusukuru enzanensis Saito & Ono, 2001 (type species) – Japan
- Nipponotusukuru spiniger Saito & Ono, 2001 – Japan

== Nispa ==
Nispa Eskov, 1993

- Nispa barbatus Eskov, 1993 – Russia, Japan

== Notholepthyphantes ==
Notholepthyphantes Millidge, 1985

- Notholepthyphantes australis (Tullgren, 1901) (type species) – Chile
- Notholepthyphantes erythrocerus (Simon, 1902) – Chile

== Nothophantes ==
Nothophantes Merrett & Stevens, 1995

- Nothophantes horridus Merrett & Stevens, 1995 – England

== Notiogyne ==
Notiogyne Tanasevitch, 2007

- Notiogyne falcata Tanasevitch, 2007 – Russia

== Notiohyphantes ==
Notiohyphantes Millidge, 1985

- Notiohyphantes excelsus (Keyserling, 1886) – Mexico to Peru, Brazil, Galapagos Islands
- Notiohyphantes laudatus Millidge, 1991 – Brazil
- Notiohyphantes meridionalis (Tullgren, 1901) (type species) – Chile

== Notiomaso ==
Notiomaso Banks, 1914

- Notiomaso australis Banks, 1914 (type species) – Falkland Islands, South Georgia
- Notiomaso barbatus (Tullgren, 1901) – Chile, Argentina, Falkland Islands
- Notiomaso christina Lavery & Snazell, 2013 – Falkland Islands
- Notiomaso exonychus Miller, 2007 – Chile
- Notiomaso flavus Tambs-Lyche, 1954 – Falkland Islands, South Georgia
- Notiomaso grytvikensis (Tambs-Lyche, 1954) – South Georgia
- Notiomaso shackletoni Lavery & Snazell, 2013 – Falkland Islands
- Notiomaso spei Lavery & Snazell, 2018 – South Georgia
- Notiomaso striatus (Usher, 1983) – Falkland Islands

== Notioscopus ==
Notioscopus Simon, 1884

- Notioscopus australis Simon, 1894 – South Africa
- Notioscopus sarcinatus (O. P.-Cambridge, 1872) (type species) – Europe, Russia
- Notioscopus sibiricus Tanasevitch, 2007 – Russia, Mongolia, China, Sakhalin Islands

== Notolinga ==
Notolinga Lavery & Dupérré, 2019

- Notolinga fuegiana (Simon, 1902) – Argentina & Falkland Islands

== Novafroneta ==
Novafroneta Blest, 1979

- Novafroneta annulipes Blest, 1979 – New Zealand
- Novafroneta gladiatrix Blest, 1979 – New Zealand
- Novafroneta nova Blest & Vink, 2003 – New Zealand
- Novafroneta parmulata Blest, 1979 – New Zealand
- Novafroneta truncata Blest & Vink, 2003 – New Zealand
- Novafroneta vulgaris Blest, 1979 (type species) – New Zealand

== Novafrontina ==
Novafrontina Millidge, 1991

- Novafrontina bipunctata (Keyserling, 1886) (type species) – Ecuador, Peru
- Novafrontina patens Millidge, 1991 – Colombia
- Novafrontina uncata (F. O. P.-Cambridge, 1902) – Mexico to Brazil

== Novalaetesia ==
Novalaetesia Millidge, 1988

- Novalaetesia anceps Millidge, 1988 (type species) – New Zealand
- Novalaetesia atra Blest & Vink, 2003 – New Zealand

== Nusoncus ==
Nusoncus Wunderlich, 2008

- Nusoncus nasutus (Schenkel, 1925) – Europe

== Oaphantes ==
Oaphantes Chamberlin & Ivie, 1943

- Oaphantes pallidulus (Banks, 1904) – USA

== Obrimona ==
Obrimona Strand, 1934

- Obrimona tennenti (Simon, 1894) – Sri Lanka

== Obscuriphantes ==
Obscuriphantes Saaristo & Tanasevitch, 2000

- Obscuriphantes bacelarae (Schenkel, 1938) – Portugal, France
- Obscuriphantes obscurus (Blackwall, 1841) (type species) – Palearctic
  - Obscuriphantes obscurus dilutior (Simon, 1929) – Europe
- Obscuriphantes pseudoobscurus (Marusik, Hippa & Koponen, 1996) – Russia

== Oculocornia ==
Oculocornia Oliger, 1985

- Oculocornia orientalis Oliger, 1985 – Russia

== Oedothorax ==
Oedothorax Bertkau, in Förster & Bertkau, 1883

- Oedothorax agrestis (Blackwall, 1853) – Palearctic
  - Oedothorax agrestis longipes (Simon, 1884) – Switzerland
- Oedothorax alascensis (Banks, 1900) – Alaska
- Oedothorax angelus Tanasevitch, 1998 – Nepal
- Oedothorax annulatus Wunderlich, 1974 – Nepal
- Oedothorax apicatus (Blackwall, 1850) – Palearctic
- Oedothorax assuetus Tanasevitch, 1998 – Nepal
- Oedothorax banksi Strand, 1906 – Alaska
- Oedothorax biantu Zhao & Li, 2014 − China
- Oedothorax bifoveatus Tanasevitch, 2017 − Malaysia (Borneo), Indonesia (Java)
- Oedothorax brevipalpus (Banks, 1901) – USA
- Oedothorax caporiaccoi Roewer, 1942 – Karakorum
- Oedothorax cascadeus Chamberlin, 1949 – USA
- Oedothorax clypeellum Tanasevitch, 1998 – Nepal
- Oedothorax collinus Ma & Zhu, 1991 – China
- Oedothorax convector Tanasevitch, 2014 − Thailand
- Oedothorax cornutus Tanasevitch, 2015 − India
- Oedothorax coronatus Tanasevitch, 1998 – Nepal
- Oedothorax cruciferoides Tanasevitch, 2020 – Nepal
- Oedothorax cunur Tanasevitch, 2015 − India
- Oedothorax dismodicoides Wunderlich, 1974 – Nepal
- Oedothorax elongatus Wunderlich, 1974 – Nepal
- Oedothorax esyunini Zhang, Zhang & Yu, 2003 – China
- Oedothorax falcifer Tanasevitch, 1998 – Nepal
- Oedothorax falciferoides Tanasevitch, 2015 − India
- Oedothorax fuscus (Blackwall, 1834) – Europe, Mallorca, North Africa, Azores, Russia
- Oedothorax gibbifer (Kulczynski, 1882) – Europe, Russia
- Oedothorax gibbosus (Blackwall, 1841) (type species) – Palearctic
- Oedothorax globiceps Thaler, 1987 – Kashmir
- Oedothorax hirsutus Wunderlich, 1974 – Nepal
- Oedothorax holmi Wunderlich, 1978 – East Africa
- Oedothorax howardi Petrunkevitch, 1925 – USA
- Oedothorax hulongensis Zhu & Wen, 1980 – Russia, China
- Oedothorax insulanus Paik, 1980 – Korea
- Oedothorax japonicus Kishida, 1910 – Japan
- Oedothorax kathmandu Tanasevitch, 2020 – Nepal
- Oedothorax khasi Tanasevitch, 2017 – India
- Oedothorax kodaikanal Tanasevitch, 2015 − India
- Oedothorax latitibialis Bosmans, 1988 – Cameroon
- Oedothorax legrandi Jocque, 1985 – Comoro Islands
- Oedothorax limatus Crosby, 1905 – USA
- Oedothorax lineatus Wunderlich, 1974 – Nepal
- Oedothorax longiductus Bosmans, 1988 – Cameroon
- Oedothorax lopchu Tanasevitch, 2015 − India
- Oedothorax lucidus Wunderlich, 1974 – Nepal
- Oedothorax macrophthalmus Locket & Russell-Smith, 1980 – Nigeria, Ivory Coast
- Oedothorax malearmatus Tanasevitch, 1998 – Nepal
- Oedothorax mangsima Tanasevitch, 2020 – Nepal
- Oedothorax maximus (Emerton, 1882) – USA
- Oedothorax meghalaya Tanasevitch, 2015 − India
- Oedothorax meridionalis Tanasevitch, 1987 – Iran, Central Asia
- Oedothorax modestus Tanasevitch, 1998 – Nepal
- Oedothorax mongolensis (Heimer, 1987) – Russia, Mongolia
- Oedothorax monoceros Miller, 1970 – Angola
- Oedothorax montifer (Emerton, 1882) – USA
- Oedothorax muscicola Bosmans, 1988 – Cameroon
- Oedothorax myanmar Tanasevitch, 2017 − Myanmar
- Oedothorax nazareti Scharff, 1989 – Ethiopia
- Oedothorax paludigena Simon, 1926 – France, Corsica, Greece
- Oedothorax paracymbialis Tanasevitch, 2015 − India
- Oedothorax paralegrandi Tanasevitch, 2016 − India (Himalaya)
- Oedothorax pilosus Wunderlich, 1978 – Ethiopia
- Oedothorax retusus (Westring, 1851) – Palearctic
- Oedothorax rusticus Tanasevitch, 2015 − India
- Oedothorax savigniformis Tanasevitch, 1998 – Nepal
- Oedothorax seminolus Ivie & Barrows, 1935 – USA
- Oedothorax sexmaculatus Saito & Ono, 2001 – Japan
- Oedothorax sexoculatus Wunderlich, 1974 – Nepal
- Oedothorax sexoculorum Tanasevitch, 1998 – Nepal
- Oedothorax simplicithorax Tanasevitch, 1998 – Nepal
- Oedothorax sohra Tanasevitch, 2020 – India
- Oedothorax stylus Tanasevitch, 2015 − India
- Oedothorax tholusus Tanasevitch, 1998 – Nepal
- Oedothorax tingitanus (Simon, 1884) – Spain, Morocco, Algeria, Tunisia
- Oedothorax triceps Tanasevitch, 2020 – Nepal
- Oedothorax trilineatus Saito, 1934 – Japan
- Oedothorax trilobatus (Banks, 1896) – USA, Canada, Russia
- Oedothorax unciger Tanasevitch, 2020 – India
- Oedothorax uncus Tanasevitch, 2015 − India
- Oedothorax unicolor Wunderlich, 1974 – Nepal
- Oedothorax usitatus Jocque & Scharff, 1986 – Tanzania
- Oedothorax villosus Tanasevitch, 2015 − India

== Oia ==
Oia Wunderlich, 1973

- Oia breviprocessia Song & Li, 2010 – China
- Oia imadatei (Oi, 1964) – Russia, Korea, Taiwan, Japan
- Oia kathmandu Tanasevitch, 2019 – Nepal
- Oia sororia Wunderlich, 1973 (type species) – India, Nepal

== Oilinyphia ==
Oilinyphia Ono & Saito, 1989

- Oilinyphia hengji Zhao & Li, 2014 − China
- Oilinyphia jadbounorum Ponksee & Tanikawa, 2010 – Thailand
- Oilinyphia peculiaris Ono & Saito, 1989 (type species) – Ryukyu Islands

== Okhotigone ==
Okhotigone Eskov, 1993

- Okhotigone sounkyoensis (Saito, 1986) – Russia, China, Japan

== Onychembolus ==
Onychembolus Millidge, 1985

- Onychembolus anceps Millidge, 1991 – Chile
- Onychembolus subalpinus Millidge, 1985 (type species) – Chile, Argentina

== Ophrynia ==
Ophrynia Jocque, 1981

- Ophrynia galeata Jocque & Scharff, 1986 – Tanzania
  - Ophrynia galeata lukwangulensis Jocque & Scharff, 1986 – Tanzania
- Ophrynia infecta Jocque & Scharff, 1986 – Tanzania
- Ophrynia insulana Scharff, 1990 – Tanzania
- Ophrynia juguma Scharff, 1990 – Tanzania
- Ophrynia perspicua Scharff, 1990 – Tanzania
- Ophrynia revelatrix Jocque & Scharff, 1986 – Tanzania
- Ophrynia rostrata Jocque & Scharff, 1986 – Tanzania
- Ophrynia summicola Jocque & Scharff, 1986 (type species) – Tanzania
- Ophrynia superciliosa Jocque, 1981 – Malawi
- Ophrynia trituberculata Bosmans, 1988 – Cameroon
- Ophrynia truncatula Scharff, 1990 – Tanzania
- Ophrynia uncata Jocque & Scharff, 1986 – Tanzania

== Oreocyba ==
Oreocyba Holm, 1962

- Oreocyba elgonensis (Fage, 1936) (type species) – Kenya, Uganda
- Oreocyba propinqua Holm, 1962 – Kenya, Uganda

== Oreoneta ==
Oreoneta Kulczynski, 1894

- Oreoneta alpina (Eskov, 1987) – Russia
- Oreoneta arctica (Holm, 1960) – Russia, Kurile Islands, Alaska
- Oreoneta banffkluane Saaristo & Marusik, 2004 – Canada
- Oreoneta beringiana Saaristo & Marusik, 2004 – Russia, Kurile Islands, Alaska, Canada
- Oreoneta brunnea (Emerton, 1882) – USA, Canada
- Oreoneta eskimopoint Saaristo & Marusik, 2004 – USA, Canada
- Oreoneta eskovi Saaristo & Marusik, 2004 – Russia, Kazakhstan
- Oreoneta fennica Saaristo & Marusik, 2004 – Finland
- Oreoneta fortyukon Saaristo & Marusik, 2004 – Alaska, Canada
- Oreoneta frigida (Thorell, 1872) (type species) – Greenland to Norway
- Oreoneta garrina (Chamberlin, 1949) – USA, Canada
- Oreoneta herschel Saaristo & Marusik, 2004 – Canada
- Oreoneta intercepta (O. P.-Cambridge, 1873) – Russia
- Oreoneta kurile Saaristo & Marusik, 2004 – Kurile Islands
- Oreoneta leviceps (L. Koch, 1879) – Russia, Alaska, Canada
- Oreoneta logunovi Saaristo & Marusik, 2004 – Russia
- Oreoneta magaputo Saaristo & Marusik, 2004 – Russia, Canada
- Oreoneta mineevi Saaristo & Marusik, 2004 – Russia
- Oreoneta mongolica (Wunderlich, 1995) – Mongolia
- Oreoneta montigena (L. Koch, 1872) – Switzerland to Slovakia
- Oreoneta punctata (Tullgren, 1955) – Sweden, Finland, Russia
- Oreoneta repeater Saaristo & Marusik, 2004 – Canada
- Oreoneta sepe Saaristo & Marusik, 2004 – Canada
- Oreoneta sinuosa (Tullgren, 1955) – Sweden, Finland, Russia
- Oreoneta tatrica (Kulczynski, 1915) – Central Europe
- Oreoneta tienshangensis Saaristo & Marusik, 2004 – Kazakhstan, China
- Oreoneta tuva Saaristo & Marusik, 2004 – Russia
- Oreoneta uralensis Saaristo & Marusik, 2004 – Russia
- Oreoneta vogelae Saaristo & Marusik, 2004 – USA
- Oreoneta wyomingia Saaristo & Marusik, 2004 – USA, Canada

== Oreonetides ==
Oreonetides Strand, 1901

- Oreonetides badzhalensis Eskov, 1991 – Russia
- Oreonetides beattyi Paquin et al., 2009 – USA
- Oreonetides beringianus Eskov, 1991 – Russia
- Oreonetides filicatus (Crosby, 1937) – USA to Alaska
- Oreonetides flavescens (Crosby, 1937) – USA, Canada
- Oreonetides flavus (Emerton, 1915) – USA, Canada
- Oreonetides glacialis (L. Koch, 1872) – Europe
- Oreonetides helsdingeni Eskov, 1984 – Russia
- Oreonetides kolymensis Eskov, 1991 – Russia
- Oreonetides minimus Tanasevitch, 2017 – Russia (Far East)
- Oreonetides quadridentatus (Wunderlich, 1972) – Belgium, Germany, Austria
- Oreonetides rectangulatus (Emerton, 1913) – USA
- Oreonetides rotundus (Emerton, 1913) – USA, Canada
- Oreonetides sajanensis Eskov, 1991 – Russia
- Oreonetides shimizui (Yaginuma, 1972) – Russia, Japan
- Oreonetides taiwanus Tanasevitch, 2011 – Taiwan
- Oreonetides vaginatus (Thorell, 1872) (type species) – Holarctic

== Oreophantes ==
Oreophantes Eskov, 1984

- Oreophantes recurvatus (Emerton, 1913) – USA, Canada

== Orfeo ==
Orfeo Miller, 2007

- Orfeo desolatus (Keyserling, 1886) – Brazil
- Orfeo jobim Miller, 2007 (type species) – Brazil

== Origanates ==
Origanates Crosby & Bishop, 1933

- Origanates rostratus (Emerton, 1882) – USA

== Orsonwelles ==
Orsonwelles Hormiga, 2002

- Orsonwelles ambersonorum Hormiga, 2002 – Hawaii
- Orsonwelles arcanus Hormiga, 2002 – Hawaii
- Orsonwelles bellum Hormiga, 2002 – Hawaii
- Orsonwelles calx Hormiga, 2002 – Hawaii
- Orsonwelles falstaffius Hormiga, 2002 – Hawaii
- Orsonwelles graphicus (Simon, 1900) – Hawaii
- Orsonwelles iudicium Hormiga, 2002 – Hawaii
- Orsonwelles macbeth Hormiga, 2002 – Hawaii
- Orsonwelles malus Hormiga, 2002 – Hawaii
- Orsonwelles othello Hormiga, 2002 – Hawaii
- Orsonwelles polites Hormiga, 2002 (type species) – Hawaii
- Orsonwelles torosus (Simon, 1900) – Hawaii
- Orsonwelles ventus Hormiga, 2002 – Hawaii

== Oryphantes ==
Oryphantes Hull, 1932

- Oryphantes aliquantulus Duperre & Paquin, 2007 – USA, Canada
- Oryphantes angulatus (O. P.-Cambridge, 1881) (type species) – Palearctic
- Oryphantes bipilis (Kulczynski, 1885) – Russia
- Oryphantes cognatus (Tanasevitch, 1992) – Russia
- Oryphantes geminus (Tanasevitch, 1982) – Russia, Kazakhstan

== Ostearius ==
Ostearius Hull, 1911

- Ostearius melanopygius (O. P.-Cambridge, 1879) (type species) – Cosmopolitan
- Ostearius muticus Gao, Gao & Zhu, 1994 – China

== Ouedia ==
Ouedia Bosmans & Abrous, 1992

- Ouedia rufithorax (Simon, 1881) – Portugal, France, Corsica, Italy, Algeria, Tunisia

== Pachydelphus ==
Pachydelphus Jocque & Bosmans, 1983

- Pachydelphus africanus (Simon, 1894) – Gabon, Sierra Leone
- Pachydelphus banco Jocque & Bosmans, 1983 (type species) – Ivory Coast
- Pachydelphus coiffaiti Jocque, 1983 – Gabon
- Pachydelphus tonqui Jocque & Bosmans, 1983 – Ivory Coast

== Pacifiphantes ==
Pacifiphantes Eskov & Marusik, 1994

- Pacifiphantes magnificus (Chamberlin & Ivie, 1943) – USA, Canada
- Pacifiphantes zakharovi Eskov & Marusik, 1994 (type species) – Russia, China

== Paikiniana ==
Paikiniana Eskov, 1992

- Paikiniana bella (Paik, 1978) (type species) – Korea
- Paikiniana biceps Song & Li, 2008 – China
- Paikiniana furcata Zhao & Li, 2014 − China
- Paikiniana iriei (Ono, 2007) – Japan
- Paikiniana keikoae (Saito, 1988) – Japan
- Paikiniana lurida (Seo, 1991) – Korea, Japan
- Paikiniana mikurana Ono, 2010 – Japan
- Paikiniana mira (Oi, 1960) – China, Korea, Japan
- Paikiniana operta Irfan & Peng, 2018 – China
- Paikiniana vulgaris (Oi, 1960) – Korea, Japan

== Palaeohyphantes ==
Palaeohyphantes Millidge, 1984

- Palaeohyphantes simplicipalpis (Wunderlich, 1976) – New South Wales

== Palliduphantes ==
Palliduphantes Saaristo & Tanasevitch, 2001

- Palliduphantes altus (Tanasevitch, 1986) – Central Asia
- Palliduphantes alutacius (Simon, 1884) – Europe
- Palliduphantes angustiformis (Simon, 1884) – Corsica, Sardinia
- Palliduphantes antroniensis (Schenkel, 1933) – Palearctic
- Palliduphantes arenicola (Denis, 1964) – France, Switzerland
- Palliduphantes baeumeri Wunderlich, 2020 – Canary Islands
- Palliduphantes banderolatus Barrientos, 2020 – Morocco
- Palliduphantes bayrami Demir, Topçu & Seyyar, 2008 – Turkey
- Palliduphantes bigerrensis (Simon, 1929) – France
- Palliduphantes bolivari (Fage, 1931) – Portugal, Spain, Gibraltar
- Palliduphantes brignolii (Kratochvil, 1978) – Croatia
- Palliduphantes byzantinus (Fage, 1931) – Bulgaria, Greece, Turkey
- Palliduphantes cadiziensis (Wunderlich, 1980) – Portugal, Spain, Gibraltar, Morocco
- Palliduphantes carusoi (Brignoli, 1979) – Sicily
- Palliduphantes cebennicus (Simon, 1929) – France
- Palliduphantes ceretanus (Denis, 1962) – France
- Palliduphantes cernuus (Simon, 1884) – France, Spain
- Palliduphantes chenini Bosmans, 2003 – Tunisia
- Palliduphantes conradini (Brignoli, 1971) – Italy
- Palliduphantes constantinescui (Georgescu, 1989) – Romania
- Palliduphantes corfuensis (Wunderlich, 1995) – Greece
- Palliduphantes corsicos (Wunderlich, 1980) – Corsica
- Palliduphantes cortesi Ribera & De Mas, 2003 – Spain
- Palliduphantes culicinus (Simon, 1884) – France, Switzerland
- Palliduphantes curvus Tanasevitch, 2019 – Portugal, Spain
- Palliduphantes dentatidens (Simon, 1929) – France, Italy
- Palliduphantes elburz Tanasevitch, 2017 − Iran
- Palliduphantes epaminondae (Brignoli, 1979) – Greece
- Palliduphantes ericaeus (Blackwall, 1853) – Europe, Russia
- Palliduphantes fagei (Machado, 1939) – Spain
- Palliduphantes fagicola (Simon, 1929) – France
- Palliduphantes florentinus (Caporiacco, 1947) – Italy
- Palliduphantes garganicus (Caporiacco, 1951) – Italy
- Palliduphantes gladiola (Simon, 1884) – France (incl. Corsica)
- Palliduphantes gypsi Ribera & De Mas, 2003 – Spain
- Palliduphantes insignis (O. P.-Cambridge, 1913) – Europe
- Palliduphantes intirmus (Tanasevitch, 1987) – Russia, Central Asia
- Palliduphantes istrianus (Kulczynski, 1914) – Eastern Europe
- Palliduphantes kalaensis (Bosmans, 1985) – Algeria
- Palliduphantes khobarum (Charitonov, 1947) – Greece, Turkey, Russia, Central Asia
- Palliduphantes labilis (Simon, 1913) – Algeria, Tunisia
- Palliduphantes ligulifer (Denis, 1952) – Romania
- Palliduphantes liguricus (Simon, 1929) – Europe
- Palliduphantes longiscapus (Wunderlich, 1987) – Canary Islands
- Palliduphantes longiseta (Simon, 1884) – Corsica, Italy
- Palliduphantes lorifer (Simon, 1907) – Spain
- Palliduphantes malickyi (Wunderlich, 1980) – Crete
- Palliduphantes margaritae (Denis, 1934) – France
- Palliduphantes megascapus Barrientos, 2020 – Morocco
- Palliduphantes melitensis (Bosmans, 1994) – Malta
- Palliduphantes milleri (Starega, 1972) – Poland, Slovakia, Romania, Ukraine
- Palliduphantes minimus (Deeleman-Reinhold, 1985) – Cyprus
- Palliduphantes montanus (Kulczynski, 1898) – Germany, Austria, Italy, Turkey
- Palliduphantes oredonensis (Denis, 1950) – France
- Palliduphantes pallidus (O. P.-Cambridge, 1871) (type species) – Palearctic
- Palliduphantes palmensis (Wunderlich, 1992) – Canary Islands
- Palliduphantes pillichi (Kulczynski, 1915) – Central Europe
- Palliduphantes rubens (Wunderlich, 1987) – Canary Islands
- Palliduphantes salfii (Dresco, 1949) – Italy
- Palliduphantes sanctivincenti (Simon, 1872) – France
- Palliduphantes sbordonii (Brignoli, 1970) – Iran
- Palliduphantes schmitzi (Kulczynski, 1899) – Madeira, Azores
- Palliduphantes solivagus (Tanasevitch, 1986) – Kyrgyzstan
- Palliduphantes spelaeorum (Kulczynski, 1914) – Balkans, Bulgaria, Greece
- Palliduphantes stygius (Simon, 1884) – Portugal, Spain, France, Azores
- Palliduphantes tenerifensis (Wunderlich, 1992) – Canary Islands
- Palliduphantes theosophicus (Tanasevitch, 1987) – Nepal
- Palliduphantes tricuspis Bosmans, 2006 – Algeria
- Palliduphantes trnovensis (Drensky, 1931) – Serbia, Macedonia, Bulgaria
- Palliduphantes vadelli Lissner, 2016 − Spain (Majorca)
- Palliduphantes yakourensis Bosmans, 2006 – Algeria
- Palliduphantes zaragozai (Ribera, 1981) – Spain

== Panamomops ==
Panamomops Simon, 1884

- Panamomops affinis Miller & Kratochvil, 1939 – Switzerland, Germany, Austria, Czech Republic, Slovakia
- Panamomops depilis Eskov & Marusik, 1994 – Russia, Kazakhstan
- Panamomops dybowskii (O. P.-Cambridge, 1873) – Russia
- Panamomops fagei Miller & Kratochvil, 1939 – Europe
- Panamomops fedotovi (Charitonov, 1937) – Ukraine, Georgia, Armenia
- Panamomops inconspicuus (Miller & Valesova, 1964) – Europe
- Panamomops latifrons Miller, 1959 – Czech Republic, Slovakia, Austria, Balkans
- Panamomops mengei Simon, 1926 – Palearctic
- Panamomops mutilus (Denis, 1962) – Spain, France
- Panamomops palmgreni Thaler, 1973 – Germany, Switzerland, Austria, Slovakia
- Panamomops pamiricus Tanasevitch, 1989 – Kyrgyzstan
- Panamomops sulcifrons (Wider, 1834) (type species) – Europe, Russia
- Panamomops tauricornis (Simon, 1881) – Palearctic

== Paracornicularia ==
Paracornicularia Crosby & Bishop, 1931

- Paracornicularia bicapillata Crosby & Bishop, 1931 – USA

== Paracymboides ==
Paracymboides Tanasevitch, 2011

- Paracymboides aduncus Tanasevitch, 2011 – India
- Paracymboides tibialis Tanasevitch, 2011 (type species) – India

== Paraeboria ==
Paraeboria Eskov, 1990

- Paraeboria jeniseica (Eskov, 1981) – Russia

== Parafroneta ==
Parafroneta Blest, 1979

- Parafroneta ambigua Blest, 1979 – New Zealand
- Parafroneta confusa Blest, 1979 – New Zealand
- Parafroneta demota Blest & Vink, 2002 – New Zealand
- Parafroneta haurokoae Blest & Vink, 2002 – New Zealand
- Parafroneta hirsuta Blest & Vink, 2003 – New Zealand
- Parafroneta insula Blest, 1979 – New Zealand
- Parafroneta marrineri (Hogg, 1909) (type species) – Campbell Islands
- Parafroneta minuta Blest, 1979 – New Zealand
- Parafroneta monticola Blest, 1979 – New Zealand
- Parafroneta persimilis Blest, 1979 – New Zealand
- Parafroneta pilosa Blest & Vink, 2003 – New Zealand
- Parafroneta subalpina Blest & Vink, 2002 – New Zealand
- Parafroneta subantarctica Blest, 1979 – New Zealand
- Parafroneta westlandica Blest & Vink, 2002 – New Zealand

== Paraglyphesis ==
Paraglyphesis Eskov, 1991

- Paraglyphesis lasiargoides Eskov, 1991 – Russia
- Paraglyphesis monticola Eskov, 1991 – Russia
- Paraglyphesis polaris Eskov, 1991 (type species) – Russia

== Paragongylidiellum ==
Paragongylidiellum Wunderlich, 1973

- Paragongylidiellum caliginosum Wunderlich, 1973 – India, Nepal

== Paraletes ==
Paraletes Millidge, 1991

- Paraletes pogo Miller, 2007 – Peru
- Paraletes timidus Millidge, 1991 (type species) – Brazil

== Parameioneta ==
Parameioneta Locket, 1982

- Parameioneta bilobata Li & Zhu, 1993 – China, Vietnam
- Parameioneta bishou Zhao & Li, 2014 − China, Thailand
- Parameioneta javaensis Tanasevitch, 2020 − Java
- Parameioneta multifida Zhao & Li, 2014 − China
- Parameioneta spicata Locket, 1982 (type species) – Malaysia
- Parameioneta sulawesi (Tanasevitch, 2012) (type species) – Sulawesi
- Parameioneta tricolorata Zhao & Li, 2014 − China
- Parameioneta yongjing Yin, 2012 – China

== Parapelecopsis ==
Parapelecopsis Wunderlich, 1992

- Parapelecopsis conimbricensis Bosmans & Crespo, 2010 – Portugal
- Parapelecopsis mediocris (Kulczynski, 1899) – Madeira
- Parapelecopsis nemoralioides (O. P.-Cambridge, 1884) – Europe
- Parapelecopsis nemoralis (Blackwall, 1841) (type species) – Europe, Russia

== Parasisis ==
Parasisis Eskov, 1984

- Parasisis amurensis Eskov, 1984 – Russia, China, Korea, Japan

== Paratapinocyba ==
Paratapinocyba Saito, 1986

- Paratapinocyba kumadai Saito, 1986 (type species) – Japan
- Paratapinocyba oiwa (Saito, 1980) – Japan

== Paratmeticus ==
Paratmeticus Marusik & Koponen, 2010

- Paratmeticus bipunctis (Bösenberg & Strand, 1906) – Russia, Sakhalin, Japan

== Parawubanoides ==
Parawubanoides Eskov & Marusik, 1992

- Parawubanoides unicornis (O. P.-Cambridge, 1873) – Russia, Mongolia

== Parhypomma ==
Parhypomma Eskov, 1992

- Parhypomma naraense (Oi, 1960) – Japan

== Paro ==
Paro Berland, 1942

- Paro simoni Berland, 1942 – Rapa Iti

== Parvunaria ==
Parvunaria Tanasevitch, 2018

- Parvunaria birma Tanasevitch, 2018 – Myanmar

== Patagoneta ==
Patagoneta Millidge, 1985

- Patagoneta antarctica (Tullgren, 1901) – Chile

== Pecado ==
Pecado Hormiga & Scharff, 2005

- Pecado impudicus (Denis, 1945) – Spain, Morocco, Algeria

== Pelecopsidis ==
Pelecopsidis Bishop & Crosby, 1935

- Pelecopsidis frontalis (Banks, 1904) – USA

== Pelecopsis ==
Pelecopsis Simon, 1864

- Pelecopsis agaetensis Wunderlich, 1987 – Canary Islands
- Pelecopsis albifrons Holm, 1979 – Kenya
- Pelecopsis alpica Thaler, 1991 – Switzerland, Austria, Italy
- Pelecopsis alticola (Berland, 1936) – Kenya
  - Pelecopsis alticola elgonensis (Holm, 1962) – Uganda
  - Pelecopsis alticola kenyensis (Holm, 1962) – Kenya
  - Pelecopsis alticola kivuensis (Miller, 1970) – Congo
- Pelecopsis amabilis (Simon, 1884) – Algeria
- Pelecopsis aureipes Denis, 1962 – Morocco
- Pelecopsis biceps (Holm, 1962) – Tanzania
- Pelecopsis bicornuta Hillyard, 1980 – Spain, Morocco
- Pelecopsis bishopi Kaston, 1945 – USA
- Pelecopsis bucephala (O. P.-Cambridge, 1875) – Western Mediterranean
- Pelecopsis capitata (Simon, 1884) – France
- Pelecopsis cedricola Bosmans & Abrous, 1992 – Algeria
- Pelecopsis coccinea (O. P.-Cambridge, 1875) – Spain, Morocco
- Pelecopsis crassipes Tanasevitch, 1987 – Russia, Central Asia
- Pelecopsis denisi Brignoli, 1983 – Andorra, France
- Pelecopsis digitulus Bosmans & Abrous, 1992 – Algeria
- Pelecopsis dorniana Heimer, 1987 – Russia, Mongolia
- Pelecopsis elongata (Wider, 1834) (type species) – Europe, Russia, Israel
- Pelecopsis eminula (Simon, 1884) – France, Italy
- Pelecopsis flava Holm, 1962 – Uganda, Congo
- Pelecopsis fornicata Miller, 1970 – Congo
- Pelecopsis fulva Holm, 1962 – Uganda
- Pelecopsis hamata Bosmans, 1988 – Cameroon
- Pelecopsis hipporegia (Denis, 1968) – Algeria, Tunisia
- Pelecopsis humiliceps Holm, 1979 – Kenya, Uganda
- Pelecopsis indus Tanasevitch, 2011 – India, Pakistan
- Pelecopsis inedita (O. P.-Cambridge, 1875) – Mediterranean
- Pelecopsis infusca Holm, 1962 – Uganda
- Pelecopsis intricata Jocque, 1984 – South Africa
- Pelecopsis janus Jocque, 1984 – South Africa
- Pelecopsis kabyliana Bosmans & Abrous, 1992 – Algeria
- Pelecopsis kalaensis Bosmans & Abrous, 1992 – Algeria
- Pelecopsis laptevi Tanasevitch & Fet, 1986 – Ukraine, Iran, Central Asia
- Pelecopsis leonina (Simon, 1884) – Algeria
- Pelecopsis levantensis Tanasevitch, 2016 − Israel
- Pelecopsis litoralis Wunderlich, 1987 – Canary Islands
- Pelecopsis loksai Szinetar & Samu, 2003 – Hungary
- Pelecopsis lunaris Bosmans & Abrous, 1992 – Algeria
- Pelecopsis major (Denis, 1945) – Algeria
- Pelecopsis malawiensis Jocque, 1977 – Malawi
- Pelecopsis margaretae Georgescu, 1975 – Romania
- Pelecopsis medusoides Jocque, 1984 – South Africa
- Pelecopsis mengei (Simon, 1884) – Holarctic
- Pelecopsis minor Wunderlich, 1995 – Mongolia
- Pelecopsis modica Hillyard, 1980 – Spain, Morocco
- Pelecopsis moesta (Banks, 1892) – USA
- Pelecopsis monsantensis Bosmans & Crespo, 2010 – Portugal
- Pelecopsis moschensis (Caporiacco, 1947) – Tanzania
- Pelecopsis mutica Denis, 1957 – France
- Pelecopsis nigriceps Holm, 1962 – Kenya, Uganda
- Pelecopsis nigroloba Fei, Gao & Zhu, 1995 – Russia, China
- Pelecopsis odontophora (Kulczynski, 1895) – Georgia
- Pelecopsis oranensis (Simon, 1884) – Morocco, Algeria
- Pelecopsis oujda Bosmans & Abrous, 1992 – Morocco
- Pelecopsis palmgreni Marusik & Esyunin, 1998 – Russia, Kazakhstan
- Pelecopsis papillii Scharff, 1990 – Tanzania
- Pelecopsis parallela (Wider, 1834) – Palearctic
- Pelecopsis paralleloides Tanasevitch & Fet, 1986 – Central Asia
- Pelecopsis partita Denis, 1953 – France
- Pelecopsis parvicollis Wunderlich, 1995 – Mongolia
- Pelecopsis parvioculis Miller, 1970 – Angola
- Pelecopsis pasteuri (Berland, 1936) – Tanzania
- Pelecopsis pavida (O. P.-Cambridge, 1872) – Greece, Israel
- Pelecopsis physeter (Fage, 1936) – Congo, Rwanda, Kenya, Tanzania
- Pelecopsis pooti Bosmans & Jocque, 1993 – Spain
- Pelecopsis proclinata Bosmans, 1988 – Cameroon
- Pelecopsis punctilineata Holm, 1964 – Congo, Rwanda
- Pelecopsis punctiseriata (Bösenberg & Strand, 1906) – Japan
- Pelecopsis radicicola (L. Koch, 1872) – Palearctic
- Pelecopsis reclinata (Holm, 1962) – Kenya, Uganda
- Pelecopsis riffensis Bosmans & Abrous, 1992 – Morocco
- Pelecopsis robusta Weiss, 1990 – Romania
- Pelecopsis ruwenzoriensis (Holm, 1962) – Uganda
- Pelecopsis sanje Scharff, 1990 – Tanzania
- Pelecopsis sculpta (Emerton, 1917) – Canada
  - Pelecopsis sculpta digna Chamberlin & Ivie, 1939 – USA
- Pelecopsis senecicola Holm, 1962 – Uganda
- Pelecopsis subflava Russell-Smith & Jocque, 1986 – Kenya
- Pelecopsis suilla (Simon, 1884) – Algeria
- Pelecopsis susannae (Simon, 1914) – Portugal, France
- Pelecopsis tenuipalpis Holm, 1979 – Uganda
- Pelecopsis tybaertielloides Jocque, 1984 – Kenya
- Pelecopsis unimaculata (Banks, 1892) – USA
- Pelecopsis varians (Holm, 1962) – Kenya, Uganda

== Peponocranium ==
Peponocranium Simon, 1884

- Peponocranium dubium Wunderlich, 1995 – Mongolia
- Peponocranium ludicrum (O. P.-Cambridge, 1861) (type species) – Europe, Russia
- Peponocranium orbiculatum (O. P.-Cambridge, 1882) – Germany to Russia, Georgia
- Peponocranium praeceps Miller, 1943 – Finland, Germany, to Russia, Ukraine
- Peponocranium simile Tullgren, 1955 – Sweden

== Perlongipalpus ==
Perlongipalpus Eskov & Marusik, 1991

- Perlongipalpus mannilai Eskov & Marusik, 1991 – Russia
- Perlongipalpus mongolicus Marusik & Koponen, 2008 – Mongolia
- Perlongipalpus pinipumilis Eskov & Marusik, 1991 (type species) – Russia
- Perlongipalpus saaristoi Marusik & Koponen, 2008 – Russia

== Perregrinus ==
Perregrinus Tanasevitch, 1992

- Perregrinus deformis (Tanasevitch, 1982) – Russia, Mongolia, China, Canada

== Perro ==
Perro Tanasevitch, 1992

- Perro camtschadalica (Kulczynski, 1885) – Russia
- Perro polaris (Eskov, 1986) – Russia, Canada
- Perro putoranica (Eskov, 1986) – Russia
- Perro subtilipes (Tanasevitch, 1985) (type species) – Russia
- Perro tshuktshorum (Eskov & Marusik, 1991) – Russia

== Phanetta ==
Phanetta Keyserling, 1886

- Phanetta subterranea (Emerton, 1875) – USA

== Phlattothrata ==
Phlattothrata Crosby & Bishop, 1933

- Phlattothrata flagellata (Emerton, 1911) (type species) – USA
- Phlattothrata parva (Kulczynski, 1926) – Holarctic

== Phyllarachne ==
Phyllarachne Millidge & Russell-Smith, 1992

- Phyllarachne levicula Millidge & Russell-Smith, 1992 – Borneo

== Piesocalus ==
Piesocalus Simon, 1894

- Piesocalus javanus Simon, 1894 – Java

== Piniphantes ==
Piniphantes Saaristo & Tanasevitch, 1996

- Piniphantes agnellus (Maurer & Thaler, 1988) – France, Italy
- Piniphantes cinereus (Tanasevitch, 1986) – Kyrgyzstan
- Piniphantes cirratus (Thaler, 1986) – Corsica
- Piniphantes himalayensis (Tanasevitch, 1987) – Nepal, Pakistan
- Piniphantes macer (Tanasevitch, 1986) – Kyrgyzstan
- Piniphantes pinicola (Simon, 1884) (type species) – Palearctic
- Piniphantes plumatus (Tanasevitch, 1986) – Kyrgyzstan
- Piniphantes uzbekistanicus (Tanasevitch, 1983) – Uzbekistan, Kyrgyzstan
- Piniphantes zonsteini (Tanasevitch, 1989) – Uzbekistan, Kyrgyzstan

== Pityohyphantes ==
Pityohyphantes Simon, 1929

- Pityohyphantes alticeps Chamberlin & Ivie, 1943 – USA
- Pityohyphantes brachygynus Chamberlin & Ivie, 1942 – USA
- Pityohyphantes costatus (Hentz, 1850) – USA
  - Pityohyphantes costatus annulipes (Banks, 1892) – North America
- Pityohyphantes cristatus Chamberlin & Ivie, 1942 – USA
  - Pityohyphantes cristatus coloradensis Chamberlin & Ivie, 1942 – USA
- Pityohyphantes hesperus (Chamberlin, 1920) – USA
- Pityohyphantes kamela Chamberlin & Ivie, 1943 – USA
- Pityohyphantes limitaneus (Emerton, 1915) – USA, Canada
- Pityohyphantes lomondensis Chamberlin & Ivie, 1941 – USA
- Pityohyphantes minidoka Chamberlin & Ivie, 1943 – USA
- Pityohyphantes navajo Chamberlin & Ivie, 1942 – USA
- Pityohyphantes palilis (L. Koch, 1870) – Central, Eastern Europe
- Pityohyphantes pallidus Chamberlin & Ivie, 1942 – USA
- Pityohyphantes phrygianus (C. L. Koch, 1836) (type species) – Palearctic
- Pityohyphantes rubrofasciatus (Keyserling, 1886) – USA, Canada
- Pityohyphantes subarcticus Chamberlin & Ivie, 1943 – Canada, Alaska
- Pityohyphantes tacoma Chamberlin & Ivie, 1942 – USA

== Plaesianillus ==
Plaesianillus Simon, 1926

- Plaesianillus cyclops (Simon, 1881) – France

== Platyspira ==
Platyspira Song & Li, 2009

- Platyspira tanasevitchi Song & Li, 2009 – China

== Plectembolus ==
Plectembolus Millidge & Russell-Smith, 1992

- Plectembolus biflectus Millidge & Russell-Smith, 1992 – Philippines
- Plectembolus quadriflectus Millidge & Russell-Smith, 1992 (type species) – Sumatra
- Plectembolus quinqueflectus Millidge & Russell-Smith, 1992 – Sumatra
- Plectembolus similis Millidge & Russell-Smith, 1992 – Sumatra
- Plectembolus triflectus Millidge & Russell-Smith, 1992 – Malaysia

== Plesiophantes ==
Plesiophantes Heimer, 1981

- Plesiophantes joosti Heimer, 1981 (type species) – Russia, Georgia, Turkey
- Plesiophantes simplex Tanasevitch, 1987 – Georgia
- Plesiophantes tanasevitchi Wunderlich, 2011 – Russia

== Plicatiductus ==
Plicatiductus Millidge & Russell-Smith, 1992

- Plicatiductus storki Millidge & Russell-Smith, 1992 – Sulawesi

== Pocadicnemis ==
Pocadicnemis Simon, 1884

- Pocadicnemis americana Millidge, 1976 – USA, Canada, Greenland
- Pocadicnemis carpatica (Chyzer, 1894) – Central, Eastern Europe
- Pocadicnemis desioi Caporiacco, 1935 – Karakorum
- Pocadicnemis jacksoni Millidge, 1976 – Portugal, Spain, France, China
- Pocadicnemis juncea Locket & Millidge, 1953 – Palearctic
- Pocadicnemis occidentalis Millidge, 1976 – USA
- Pocadicnemis pumila (Blackwall, 1841) (type species) – Holarctic

== Pocobletus ==
Pocobletus Simon, 1894

- Pocobletus bivittatus Simon, 1897 – St. Vincent
- Pocobletus coroniger Simon, 1894 (type species) – Costa Rica to Venezuela

== Poecilafroneta ==
Poecilafroneta Blest, 1979

- Poecilafroneta caudata Blest, 1979 – New Zealand

== Poeciloneta ==
Poeciloneta Kulczynski, 1894

- Poeciloneta ancora Zhai & Zhu, 2008 – China
- Poeciloneta bellona Chamberlin & Ivie, 1943 – USA
- Poeciloneta bihamata (Emerton, 1882) – USA
- Poeciloneta calcaratus (Emerton, 1909) – Alaska, Canada, USA
- Poeciloneta canionis Chamberlin & Ivie, 1943 – USA
- Poeciloneta fructuosa (Keyserling, 1886) – USA
- Poeciloneta lyrica (Zorsch, 1937) – North America
- Poeciloneta pallida Kulczynski, 1908 – Russia
- Poeciloneta petrophila Tanasevitch, 1989 – Russia, Canada
- Poeciloneta tanasevitchi Marusik, 1991 – Russia
- Poeciloneta theridiformis (Emerton, 1911) – Russia, North America
- Poeciloneta vakkhanka Tanasevitch, 1989 – Russia
- Poeciloneta variegata (Blackwall, 1841) (type species) – Holarctic
- Poeciloneta xizangensis Zhai & Zhu, 2008 – China

== Porrhomma ==
Porrhomma Simon, 1884

- Porrhomma altaica Růžička, 2018 – Altai (Russia, Kazakhstan)
- Porrhomma boreale (Banks, 1899) – Russia, Mongolia, Alaska
- Porrhomma borgesi Wunderlich, 2008 – Azores
- Porrhomma cambridgei Merrett, 1994 – Europe
- Porrhomma campbelli F. O. P.-Cambridge, 1894 – Palearctic
- Porrhomma cavernicola (Keyserling, 1886) – USA
- Porrhomma convexum (Westring, 1851) (type species) – Holarctic
- Porrhomma egeria Simon, 1884 – Europe, Russia
- Porrhomma errans (Blackwall, 1841) – Palearctic
- Porrhomma gertschi Hackman, 1954 – Canada
- Porrhomma indecorum Simon, 1910 – Algeria
- Porrhomma longjiangense Zhu & Wang, 1983 – Russia, China
- Porrhomma macrochelis (Emerton, 1917) – Canada, Alaska
- Porrhomma magnum Tanasevitch, 2012 – Russia
- Porrhomma microcavense Wunderlich, 1990 – Europe, Russia
- Porrhomma microphthalmum (O. P.-Cambridge, 1871) – Palearctic
- Porrhomma microps (Roewer, 1931) – Europe to Azerbaijan
- Porrhomma montanum Jackson, 1913 – Palearctic
- Porrhomma myops Simon, 1884 – Europe
- Porrhomma oblitum (O. P.-Cambridge, 1871) – Europe
- Porrhomma ohkawai Saito, 1977 – Japan
- Porrhomma pallidum Jackson, 1913 – Palearctic
  - Porrhomma pallidum affinis Miller & Kratochvil, 1940 – Slovakia
- Porrhomma profundum Dahl, 1939 – Eastern Europe
- Porrhomma pygmaeum (Blackwall, 1834) – Palearctic
- Porrhomma rakanum Yaginuma & Saito, 1981 – Japan
- Porrhomma rosenhaueri (L. Koch, 1872) – Europe, Russia
- Porrhomma terrestre (Emerton, 1882) – USA

== Praestigia ==
Praestigia Millidge, 1954

- Praestigia duffeyi Millidge, 1954 (type species) – Europe
- Praestigia eskovi Marusik, Gnelitsa & Koponen, 2008 – Russia
- Praestigia groenlandica Holm, 1967 – Canada, Greenland
- Praestigia kulczynskii Eskov, 1979 – Russia, Japan, Canada
- Praestigia makarovae Marusik, Gnelitsa & Koponen, 2008 – Russia
- Praestigia pini (Holm, 1950) – Sweden, Finland, Russia, Mongolia
- Praestigia sibirica Marusik, Gnelitsa & Koponen, 2008 – Russia, Alaska
- Praestigia uralensis Marusik, Gnelitsa & Koponen, 2008 – Russia

== Primerigonina ==
Primerigonina Wunderlich, 1995

- Primerigonina australis Wunderlich, 1995 – Panama

== Prinerigone ==
Prinerigone Millidge, 1988

- Prinerigone aethiopica (Tullgren, 1910) – Cameroon, Kenya, Tanzania
- Prinerigone pigra (Blackwall, 1862) – Madeira
- Prinerigone vagans (Audouin, 1826) (type species) – Old World
  - Prinerigone vagans arabica (Jocque, 1981) – Saudi Arabia

== Priperia ==
Priperia Simon, 1904

- Priperia bicolor Simon, 1904 – Hawaii

== Procerocymbium ==
Procerocymbium Eskov, 1989

- Procerocymbium buryaticum Marusik & Koponen, 2001 – Russia
- Procerocymbium dondalei Marusik & Koponen, 2001 – Canada
- Procerocymbium jeniseicum Marusik & Koponen, 2001 – Russia
- Procerocymbium sibiricum Eskov, 1989 (type species) – Russia

== Proelauna ==
Proelauna Jocque, 1981

- Proelauna humicola (Miller, 1970) – Angola, Tanzania, Malawi

== Proislandiana ==
Proislandiana Tanasevitch, 1985

- Proislandiana berroni Dimitrov, 2020 – Turkey, Armenia
- Proislandiana pallida (Kulczynski, 1908) – Russia

== Promynoglenes ==
Promynoglenes Blest, 1979

- Promynoglenes grandis Blest, 1979 – New Zealand
- Promynoglenes minuscula Blest & Vink, 2003 – New Zealand
- Promynoglenes minuta Blest & Vink, 2002 – New Zealand
- Promynoglenes nobilis Blest, 1979 (type species) – New Zealand
- Promynoglenes parvula Blest, 1979 – New Zealand
- Promynoglenes silvestris Blest, 1979 – New Zealand

== Pronasoona ==
Pronasoona Millidge, 1995

- Pronasoona aurata Millidge, 1995 – Thailand
- Pronasoona sylvatica Millidge, 1995 (type species) – Borneo

== Prosoponoides ==
Prosoponoides Millidge & Russell-Smith, 1992

- Prosoponoides hamatum Millidge & Russell-Smith, 1992 (type species) – Sumatra
- Prosoponoides jambi Tanasevitch, 2017 − Indonesia (Sumatra)
- Prosoponoides kaharianum Millidge & Russell-Smith, 1992 – Borneo
- Prosoponoides simile Millidge & Russell-Smith, 1992 – Thailand
- Prosoponoides sinense (Chen, 1991) – China, Vietnam
- Prosoponoides youyiensis Liu & J. Chen, 2020 – China

== Protoerigone ==
Protoerigone Blest, 1979

- Protoerigone obtusa Blest, 1979 – New Zealand
- Protoerigone otagoa Blest, 1979 (type species) – New Zealand

== Pseudafroneta ==
Pseudafroneta Blest, 1979

- Pseudafroneta frigida Blest, 1979 – New Zealand
- Pseudafroneta incerta (Bryant, 1935) (type species) – New Zealand
- Pseudafroneta lineata Blest, 1979 – New Zealand
- Pseudafroneta maxima Blest, 1979 – New Zealand
- Pseudafroneta pallida Blest, 1979 – New Zealand
- Pseudafroneta perplexa Blest, 1979 – New Zealand
- Pseudafroneta prominula Blest, 1979 – New Zealand

== Pseudocarorita ==
Pseudocarorita Wunderlich, 1980

- Pseudocarorita thaleri (Saaristo, 1971) – Europe

== Pseudocyba ==
Pseudocyba Tanasevitch, 1984

- Pseudocyba miracula Tanasevitch, 1984 – Russia, Kazakhstan

== Pseudohilaira ==
Pseudohilaira Eskov, 1990

- Pseudohilaira mirabilis Eskov, 1990 – Russia

== Pseudomaro ==
Pseudomaro Denis, 1966

- Pseudomaro aenigmaticus Denis, 1966 – Palearctic

== Pseudomaso ==
Pseudomaso Locket & Russell-Smith, 1980

- Pseudomaso longipes Locket & Russell-Smith, 1980 – Nigeria

== Pseudomicrargus ==
Pseudomicrargus Eskov, 1992

- Pseudomicrargus acuitegulatus (Oi, 1960) (type species) – Japan
- Pseudomicrargus asakawaensis (Oi, 1964) – Japan
- Pseudomicrargus latitegulatus (Oi, 1960) – Japan

== Pseudomicrocentria ==
Pseudomicrocentria Miller, 1970

- Pseudomicrocentria minutissima Miller, 1970 (type species) – West, Central, South Africa
- Pseudomicrocentria simplex Locket, 1982 – Malaysia
- Pseudomicrocentria uncata Tanasevitch, 2020 – Borneo

== Pseudoporrhomma ==
Pseudoporrhomma Eskov, 1993

- Pseudoporrhomma maritimum Eskov, 1993 – Russia

== Pseudotyphistes ==
Pseudotyphistes Brignoli, 1972

- Pseudotyphistes biriva Rodrigues & Ott, 2007 – Brazil
- Pseudotyphistes cambara (Ott & Lise, 1997) – Brazil
- Pseudotyphistes cristatus (Ott & Lise, 1997) – Brazil
- Pseudotyphistes ludibundus (Keyserling, 1886) – Peru
- Pseudotyphistes pallidus (Millidge, 1991) – Argentina
- Pseudotyphistes pennatus Brignoli, 1972 (type species) – Uruguay
- Pseudotyphistes vulpiscaudatus (Ott & Lise, 1997) – Brazil

== Pseudowubana ==
Pseudowubana Eskov & Marusik, 1992

- Pseudowubana wagae (O. P.-Cambridge, 1873) – Russia, Mongolia

== Psilocymbium ==
Psilocymbium Millidge, 1991

- Psilocymbium acanthodes Miller, 2007 – Argentina
- Psilocymbium antonina Rodrigues & Ott, 2010 – Brazil
- Psilocymbium defloccatum (Keyserling, 1886) – Peru
- Psilocymbium incertum Millidge, 1991 – Colombia
- Psilocymbium lineatum (Millidge, 1991) – Brazil
- Psilocymbium pilifrons Millidge, 1991 – Colombia
- Psilocymbium tuberosum Millidge, 1991 (type species) – Brazil

== See also ==
- List of Linyphiidae species (A–H)
- List of Linyphiidae species (Q–Z)
