= Montilaira =

Scientific classification
- Kingdom: Animalia
- Phylum: Arthropoda
- Subphylum: Chelicerata
- Class: Arachnida
- Order: Araneae
- Infraorder: Araneomorphae
- Family: Linyphiidae
- Genus: Montilaira; Chamberlin, 1921
- Species: M. uta

Binomial name
- Montilaira uta (Chamberlin, 1919)

Genus of spiders

Montilaira is a monotypic genus of North American dwarf spiders containing the single species, Montilaira uta. It was first described by Ralph Vary Chamberlin in 1921, and has only been found in the United States.
