= Ouedia =

Scientific classification
- Kingdom: Animalia
- Phylum: Arthropoda
- Subphylum: Chelicerata
- Class: Arachnida
- Order: Araneae
- Infraorder: Araneomorphae
- Family: Linyphiidae
- Genus: Ouedia; Bosmans & Abrous, 1992
- Species: O. rufithorax

Binomial name
- Ouedia rufithorax (Simon, 1881)

Genus of spiders

Ouedia is a monotypic genus of dwarf spiders containing the single species, Ouedia rufithorax. It was first described by R. Bosmans & O. Abrous in 1992, and has only been found in Algeria and Tunisia.
