= Johorea =

Scientific classification
- Kingdom: Animalia
- Phylum: Arthropoda
- Subphylum: Chelicerata
- Class: Arachnida
- Order: Araneae
- Infraorder: Araneomorphae
- Family: Linyphiidae
- Genus: Johorea; Locket, 1982
- Species: J. decorata

Binomial name
- Johorea decorata Locket, 1982

Genus of spiders

Johorea is a monotypic genus of Southeast Asian dwarf spiders containing the single species, Johorea decorata. It was first described by G. H. Locket in 1982, and has only been found in Malaysia.
