= Pseudomaro =

Scientific classification
- Kingdom: Animalia
- Phylum: Arthropoda
- Subphylum: Chelicerata
- Class: Arachnida
- Order: Araneae
- Infraorder: Araneomorphae
- Family: Linyphiidae
- Genus: Pseudomaro; Denis, 1966
- Species: P. aenigmaticus

Binomial name
- Pseudomaro aenigmaticus Denis, 1966

Genus of spiders

Pseudomaro is a monotypic genus of sheet weavers containing the single species, Pseudomaro aenigmaticus. It was first described by J. Denis in 1966, and has only been found in Europe.
