= Plaesianillus =

Scientific classification
- Kingdom: Animalia
- Phylum: Arthropoda
- Subphylum: Chelicerata
- Class: Arachnida
- Order: Araneae
- Infraorder: Araneomorphae
- Family: Linyphiidae
- Genus: Plaesianillus; Simon, 1926
- Species: P. cyclops

Binomial name
- Plaesianillus cyclops (Simon, 1881)

Genus of spiders

Plaesianillus is a monotypic genus of European sheet weavers containing the single species, Plaesianillus cyclops. It was first described by Eugène Louis Simon in 1926, and has only been found in France.
