= Piesocalus =

Scientific classification
- Kingdom: Animalia
- Phylum: Arthropoda
- Subphylum: Chelicerata
- Class: Arachnida
- Order: Araneae
- Infraorder: Araneomorphae
- Family: Linyphiidae
- Genus: Piesocalus; Simon, 1894
- Species: P. javanus

Binomial name
- Piesocalus javanus Simon, 1894

Genus of spiders

Piesocalus is a monotypic genus of Southeast Asian dwarf spiders containing the single species, Piesocalus javanus. It was first described by Eugène Louis Simon in 1894, and has only been found in Indonesia and on the Java.
