= Laminacauda defoei =

Scientific classification
- Domain: Eukaryota
- Kingdom: Animalia
- Phylum: Arthropoda
- Subphylum: Chelicerata
- Class: Arachnida
- Order: Araneae
- Infraorder: Araneomorphae
- Family: Linyphiidae
- Genus: Laminacauda
- Species: L. defoei

Binomial name
- Laminacauda defoei (O.P.-Cambridge, 1899)

Species of spider

Laminacauda defoei is a species of sheet weaver found in the Juan Fernandez Islands. It was described by O.P.-Cambridge in 1899.
