= Lotusiphantes =

Scientific classification
- Kingdom: Animalia
- Phylum: Arthropoda
- Subphylum: Chelicerata
- Class: Arachnida
- Order: Araneae
- Infraorder: Araneomorphae
- Family: Linyphiidae
- Genus: Lotusiphantes; Chen & Yin, 2001
- Species: L. nanyuensis

Binomial name
- Lotusiphantes nanyuensis Chen & Yin, 2001

Genus of spiders

Lotusiphantes is a monotypic genus of East Asian dwarf spiders containing the single species, Lotusiphantes nanyuensis. It was first described by J. Chen & C. M. Yin in 2001, and has only been found in China.
