= Lucrinus =

Scientific classification
- Kingdom: Animalia
- Phylum: Arthropoda
- Subphylum: Chelicerata
- Class: Arachnida
- Order: Araneae
- Infraorder: Araneomorphae
- Family: Linyphiidae
- Genus: Lucrinus; O. Pickard-Cambridge, 1904
- Species: L. putus

Binomial name
- Lucrinus putus O. Pickard-Cambridge, 1904

Genus of spiders

Lucrinus is a monotypic genus of African dwarf spiders containing the single species, Lucrinus putus. It was first described by Octavius Pickard-Cambridge in 1904, and has only been found in South Africa.
