= Moreiraxena =

Scientific classification
- Kingdom: Animalia
- Phylum: Arthropoda
- Subphylum: Chelicerata
- Class: Arachnida
- Order: Araneae
- Infraorder: Araneomorphae
- Family: Linyphiidae
- Genus: Moreiraxena; Miller, 1970
- Species: M. chicapensis

Binomial name
- Moreiraxena chicapensis Miller, 1970

Genus of spiders

Moreiraxena is a monotypic genus of Central African dwarf spiders containing a single species, Moreiraxena chicapensis. It was first described by F. Miller in 1970, and has only been found in Angola.
