= Platyspira =

Scientific classification
- Kingdom: Animalia
- Phylum: Arthropoda
- Subphylum: Chelicerata
- Class: Arachnida
- Order: Araneae
- Infraorder: Araneomorphae
- Family: Linyphiidae
- Genus: Platyspira; Song & Li, 2009
- Species: P. tanasevitchi

Binomial name
- Platyspira tanasevitchi Song & Li, 2009

Genus of spiders

Platyspira is a monotypic genus of East Asian sheet weavers containing the single species, Platyspira tanasevitchi. It was first described by Y. J. Song & S. Q. Li in 2009, and has only been found in China.
