= Paracornicularia =

Scientific classification
- Kingdom: Animalia
- Phylum: Arthropoda
- Subphylum: Chelicerata
- Class: Arachnida
- Order: Araneae
- Infraorder: Araneomorphae
- Family: Linyphiidae
- Genus: Paracornicularia; Crosby & Bishop, 1931
- Species: P. bicapillata

Binomial name
- Paracornicularia bicapillata Crosby & Bishop, 1931

Genus of spiders

Paracornicularia is a monotypic genus of North American dwarf spiders containing the single species, Paracornicularia bicapillata. It was first described by C. R. Crosby & S. C. Bishop in 1931, and has only been found in the United States.
