= Neocautinella =

Scientific classification
- Kingdom: Animalia
- Phylum: Arthropoda
- Subphylum: Chelicerata
- Class: Arachnida
- Order: Araneae
- Infraorder: Araneomorphae
- Family: Linyphiidae
- Genus: Neocautinella; Baert, 1990
- Species: N. neoterica

Binomial name
- Neocautinella neoterica (Keyserling, 1886)

Genus of spiders

Neocautinella is a monotypic genus of South American dwarf spiders containing the single species, Neocautinella neoterica. It was first described by L. L. Baert in 1990, and has only been found in Bolivia, Ecuador, and Peru.
