= Kagurargus =

Scientific classification
- Kingdom: Animalia
- Phylum: Arthropoda
- Subphylum: Chelicerata
- Class: Arachnida
- Order: Araneae
- Infraorder: Araneomorphae
- Family: Linyphiidae
- Genus: Kagurargus; Ono, 2007
- Species: K. kikuyai

Binomial name
- Kagurargus kikuyai Ono, 2007

Genus of spiders

Kagurargus is a monotypic genus of Asian dwarf spiders containing the single species, Kagurargus kikuyai. It was first described by H. Ono in 2007, and has only been found in Japan.
