= Ibadana =

Scientific classification
- Kingdom: Animalia
- Phylum: Arthropoda
- Subphylum: Chelicerata
- Class: Arachnida
- Order: Araneae
- Infraorder: Araneomorphae
- Family: Linyphiidae
- Genus: Ibadana; Locket & Russell-Smith, 1980
- Species: I. cuspidata

Binomial name
- Ibadana cuspidata Locket & Russell-Smith, 1980

Genus of spiders

Ibadana is a monotypic genus of African dwarf spiders containing the single species, Ibadana cuspidata. It was first described by G. H. Locket & A. Russell-Smith in 1980, and has only been found in Cameroon and Nigeria.
