= Microcyba =

Scientific classification
- Kingdom: Animalia
- Phylum: Arthropoda
- Subphylum: Chelicerata
- Class: Arachnida
- Order: Araneae
- Infraorder: Araneomorphae
- Family: Linyphiidae
- Genus: Microcyba; Holm, 1962

Type species
- M. falcata Holm, 1962

Species
- 18, see text

Genus of spiders

Microcyba is a genus of African dwarf spiders that was first described by Å. Holm in 1962.

== Species ==
As of May 2019 it contains eighteen species:

- Microcyba aculeata Holm, 1964 – Congo
- Microcyba affinis Holm, 1962 – Uganda
- Microcyba angulata Holm, 1962 – Kenya, Uganda
- Microcyba brevidentata Holm, 1962 – Tanzania
- Microcyba calida Jocqué, 1983 – Gabon
- Microcyba cameroonensis Bosmans, 1988 – Cameroon
- Microcyba divisa Jocqué, 1983 – Gabon
- Microcyba erecta Holm, 1962 – Uganda
- Microcyba falcata Holm, 1962 (type) – Uganda
- Microcyba hamata Holm, 1962 – Kenya, Uganda
- Microcyba hedbergi Holm, 1962 – Uganda
- Microcyba leleupi Holm, 1968 – Congo
- Microcyba projecta Holm, 1962 – Uganda
- Microcyba simulata Holm, 1962 – Kenya
- Microcyba tridentata Holm, 1962 – Kenya, Uganda
- Microcyba vancotthemi Bosmans, 1977 – Kenya
- Microcyba viduata Holm, 1962 – Kenya
- Microcyba vilhenai Miller, 1970 – Congo
