= Oculocornia =

Scientific classification
- Kingdom: Animalia
- Phylum: Arthropoda
- Subphylum: Chelicerata
- Class: Arachnida
- Order: Araneae
- Infraorder: Araneomorphae
- Family: Linyphiidae
- Genus: Oculocornia; Oliger, 1985
- Species: O. orientalis

Binomial name
- Oculocornia orientalis Oliger, 1985

Genus of spiders

Oculocornia is a monotypic genus of Asian dwarf spiders containing the single species, Oculocornia orientalis. It was first described by T. I. Oliger in 1985, and has only been found in Russia.
