= Priperia =

Scientific classification
- Kingdom: Animalia
- Phylum: Arthropoda
- Subphylum: Chelicerata
- Class: Arachnida
- Order: Araneae
- Infraorder: Araneomorphae
- Family: Linyphiidae
- Genus: Priperia; Simon, 1904
- Species: P. bicolor

Binomial name
- Priperia bicolor Simon, 1904

Genus of spiders

Priperia is a monotypic genus of Polynesian sheet weavers containing the single species, Priperia bicolor. It was first described by Eugène Louis Simon in 1904, and has only been found in Hawaii.
