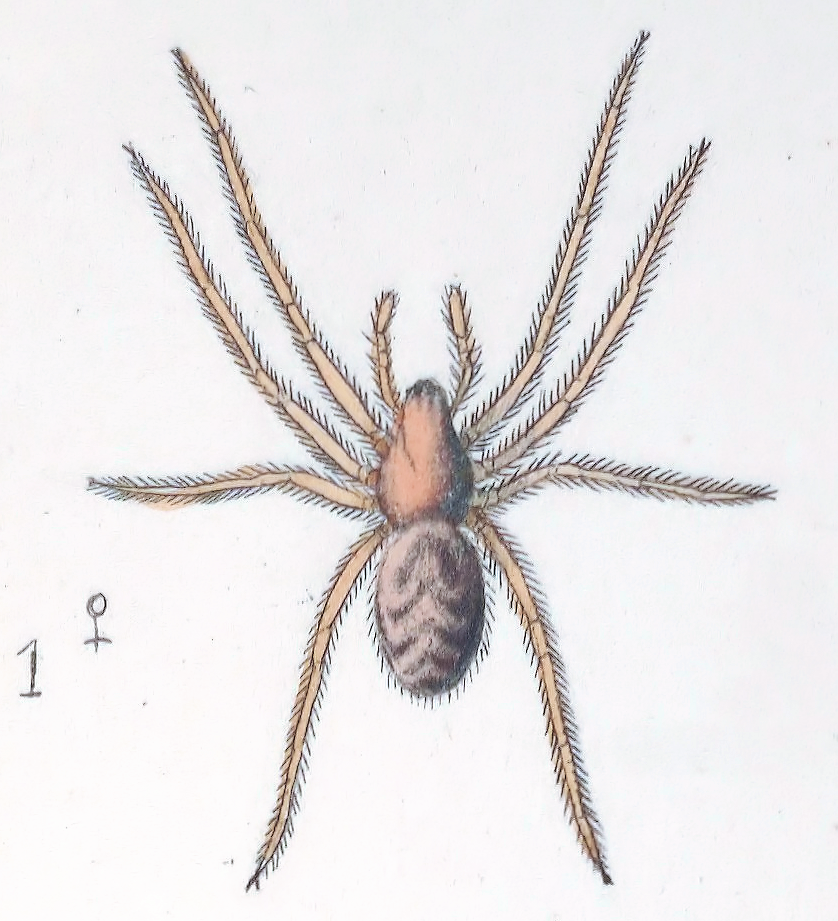
- Female Improphantes decolor

Scientific classification
- Kingdom: Animalia
- Phylum: Arthropoda
- Subphylum: Chelicerata
- Class: Arachnida
- Order: Araneae
- Infraorder: Araneomorphae
- Family: Linyphiidae
- Genus: Improphantes; Saaristo & Tanasevitch, 1996

Type species
- I. improbulus (Simon, 1929)

Species
- 20, see text

= Improphantes =

Genus of spiders

Improphantes is a genus of dwarf spiders that was first described by Michael I. Saaristo & A. V. Tanasevitch in 1996.

== Species ==
As of May 2019 it contains twenty species, found in Algeria, China, Cyprus, Finland, France, Germany, Israel, Japan, Kazakhstan, Kenya, Kyrgyzstan, Russia, Spain, Sweden, Tajikistan, and Turkey:

- Improphantes biconicus (Tanasevitch, 1992) – Russia (Far East), Japan
- Improphantes breviscapus Tanasevitch, 2013 – Israel
- Improphantes complicatus (Emerton, 1882) – North America, Europe, Russia (Europe to Far East)
- Improphantes contus Tanasevitch & Piterkina, 2007 – Kazakhstan
- Improphantes cypriot Tanasevitch, 2011 – Cyprus
- Improphantes decolor (Westring, 1861) – Europe, North Africa
- Improphantes djazairi (Bosmans, 1985) – Algeria
- Improphantes falcatus (Bosmans, 1979) – Kenya
- Improphantes flexilis (Tanasevitch, 1986) – Russia (Middle Siberia to Far East)
- Improphantes furcabilis (Wunderlich, 1987) – Canary Is.
- Improphantes geniculatus (Kulczyński, 1898) – Germany to Russia (West Siberia)
- Improphantes holmi (Kronestedt, 1975) – Sweden, Finland, Russia (Urals)
- Improphantes huberti (Wunderlich, 1980) – France (Corsica)
- Improphantes improbulus (Simon, 1929) (type) – Europe, Caucasus, Central Asia (Russia, Kazakhstan), China
- Improphantes mauensis (Caporiacco, 1949) – Kenya
- Improphantes multidentatus (Wunderlich, 1987) – Canary Is.
- Improphantes nitidus (Thorell, 1875) – Europe
- Improphantes pamiricus (Tanasevitch, 1989) – Tajikistan
- Improphantes potanini (Tanasevitch, 1989) – Kyrgyzstan
- Improphantes turok Tanasevitch, 2011 – Turkey
