= Mansuphantes =

Scientific classification
- Kingdom: Animalia
- Phylum: Arthropoda
- Subphylum: Chelicerata
- Class: Arachnida
- Order: Araneae
- Infraorder: Araneomorphae
- Family: Linyphiidae
- Genus: Mansuphantes; Saaristo & Tanasevitch, 1996

Type species
- M. mansuetus (Thorell, 1875)

Species
- 12, see text

Genus of spiders

Mansuphantes is a genus of dwarf spiders that was first described by Michael I. Saaristo & A. V. Tanasevitch in 1996.

== Species ==
As of May 2019 it contains twelve species:

- Mansuphantes arciger (Kulczyński, 1882) – Europe
- Mansuphantes aridus (Thorell, 1875) – Switzerland, Austria, Italy
- Mansuphantes auruncus (Brignoli, 1979) – Italy
- Mansuphantes fragilis (Thorell, 1875) – Europe, Turkey
- Mansuphantes korgei (Saaristo & Tanasevitch, 1996) – Turkey
- Mansuphantes mansuetus (Thorell, 1875) (type) – Europe
- Mansuphantes ovalis (Tanasevitch, 1987) – Russia, Georgia, Azerbaijan
- Mansuphantes parmatus (Tanasevitch, 1990) – Russia, Azerbaijan
- Mansuphantes pseudoarciger (Wunderlich, 1985) – France, Switzerland, Italy
- Mansuphantes rectilamellus (Deltshev, 1988) – Macedonia, Bulgaria
- Mansuphantes rossii (Caporiacco, 1927) – Austria, Italy
- Mansuphantes simoni (Kulczyński, 1894) – Western Europe
