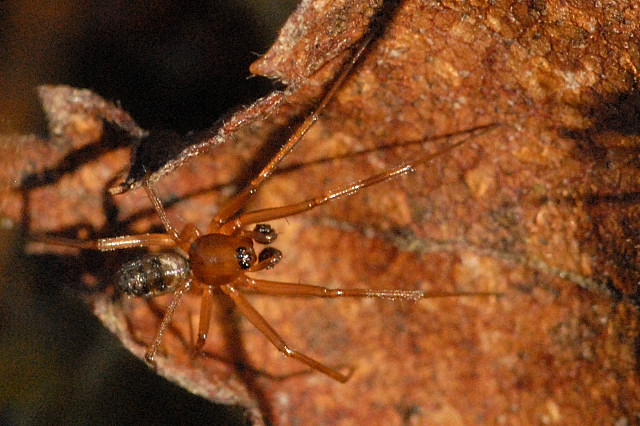
- P. ericaeus

Scientific classification
- Kingdom: Animalia
- Phylum: Arthropoda
- Subphylum: Chelicerata
- Class: Arachnida
- Order: Araneae
- Infraorder: Araneomorphae
- Family: Linyphiidae
- Genus: Palliduphantes; Saaristo & Tanasevitch, 2001

Type species
- P. pallidus (O. Pickard-Cambridge, 1871)

Species
- 74, see text

= Palliduphantes =

Genus of spiders

Palliduphantes is a genus of dwarf spiders that was first described by Michael I. Saaristo & A. V. Tanasevitch in 2001.

== Species ==
As of May 2021 it contains seventy-four species:

- P. altus (Tanasevitch, 1986) – Central Asia
- P. alutacius (Simon, 1884) – Europe
- P. angustiformis (Simon, 1884) – France (incl. Corsica), Italy (Sardinia)
- P. antroniensis (Schenkel, 1933) – Europe
- P. arenicola (Denis, 1964) – France, Switzerland
- P. baeumeri Wunderlich, 2020 – Canary Is.
- P. banderolatus Barrientos, 2020 – Morocco
- P. bayrami Demir, Topçu & Seyyar, 2008 – Turkey
- P. bigerrensis (Simon, 1929) – France
- P. bolivari (Fage, 1931) – Portugal, Spain, Gibraltar
- P. brignolii (Kratochvíl, 1978) – Croatia
- P. byzantinus (Fage, 1931) – Italy, Romania, Bulgaria, Macedonia, Greece, Turkey
- P. cadiziensis (Wunderlich, 1980) – Portugal, Spain, Gibraltar, Morocco
- P. carusoi (Brignoli, 1979) – Italy (Sicily)
- P. cebennicus (Simon, 1929) – France
- P. ceretanus (Denis, 1962) – France
- P. cernuus (Simon, 1884) – France, Spain
- P. chenini Bosmans, 2003 – Tunisia
- P. conradini (Brignoli, 1971) – Italy
- P. constantinescui (Georgescu, 1989) – Romania
- P. corfuensis (Wunderlich, 1995) – Greece
- P. corsicos (Wunderlich, 1980) – France (Corsica)
- P. cortesi Ribera & De Mas, 2003 – Spain
- P. culicinus (Simon, 1884) – France, Switzerland
- P. dentatidens (Simon, 1929) – France, Italy
- P. elburz Tanasevitch, 2017 – Iran
- P. eleonorae (Wunderlich, 1995) – Greece
- P. epaminondae (Brignoli, 1979) – Greece
- P. ericaeus (Blackwall, 1853) – Europe, Russia
- P. fagei (Machado, 1939) – Spain
- P. fagicola (Simon, 1929) – France
- P. florentinus (Caporiacco, 1947) – Italy
- P. garganicus (Caporiacco, 1951) – Italy
- P. gladiola (Simon, 1884) – France (incl. Corsica)
- P. gypsi Ribera & De Mas, 2003 – Spain
- P. insignis (O. Pickard-Cambridge, 1913) – Europe
- P. intirmus (Tanasevitch, 1987) – Russia, Central Asia
- P. istrianus (Kulczyński, 1914) – Eastern Europe
- P. kalaensis (Bosmans, 1985) – Algeria
- P. khobarum (Charitonov, 1947) – Greece, Turkey, Ukraine, Russia, Central Asia
- P. labilis (Simon, 1913) – Algeria, Tunisia
- P. ligulifer (Denis, 1952) – Romania
- P. liguricus (Simon, 1929) – Europe
- P. longiscapus (Wunderlich, 1987) – Canary Is.
- P. longiseta (Simon, 1884) – France (Corsica), Italy
- P. lorifer (Simon, 1907) – Spain
- P. malickyi (Wunderlich, 1980) – Greece (Crete)
- P. margaritae (Denis, 1934) – France
- P. melitensis (Bosmans, 1994) – Malta
- P. milleri (Starega, 1972) – Poland, Slovakia, Romania, Ukraine
- P. minimus (Deeleman-Reinhold, 1986) – Cyprus
- P. montanus (Kulczyński, 1898) – Germany, Austria, Italy, Turkey
- P. oredonensis (Denis, 1950) – France
- P. pallidus (O. Pickard-Cambridge, 1871) (type) – Europe
- P. palmensis (Wunderlich, 1992) – Canary Is.
- P. petruzzielloi Bosmans & Trotta, 2021 – Italy
- P. pillichi (Kulczyński, 1915) – Central to south-eastern Europe
- P. rubens (Wunderlich, 1987) – Canary Is.
- P. salfii (Dresco, 1949) – Italy
- P. sanctivincenti (Simon, 1872) – France
- P. sbordonii (Brignoli, 1970) – Iran
- P. schmitzi (Kulczyński, 1899) – Madeira, Azores
- P. solivagus (Tanasevitch, 1986) – Kyrgyzstan
- P. spelaeorum (Kulczyński, 1914) – SE Europe (Balkans)
- P. stygius (Simon, 1884) – Portugal, Spain, France, Azores
- P. tenerifensis (Wunderlich, 1992) – Canary Is.
- P. theosophicus (Tanasevitch, 1987) – Nepal
- P. tricuspis Bosmans, 2006 – Algeria
- P. trnovensis (Drensky, 1931) – Serbia, Montenegro, Macedonia, Bulgaria
- P. vadelli Lissner, 2016 – Spain (Majorca)
- P. yakourensis Bosmans, 2006 – Algeria
- P. zaragozai (Ribera, 1981) – Spain
