= Epigytholus =

Scientific classification
- Kingdom: Animalia
- Phylum: Arthropoda
- Subphylum: Chelicerata
- Class: Arachnida
- Order: Araneae
- Infraorder: Araneomorphae
- Family: Linyphiidae
- Genus: Epigytholus; Tanasevitch, 1996
- Species: E. kaszabi

Binomial name
- Epigytholus kaszabi (Wunderlich, 1995)

Genus of spiders

Epigytholus is a monotypic genus of Asian dwarf spiders containing the single species, Epigytholus kaszabi. It was first described by A. V. Tanasevitch in 1996, and has only been found in Mongolia and Russia.
