= Vagiphantes =

Scientific classification
- Kingdom: Animalia
- Phylum: Arthropoda
- Subphylum: Chelicerata
- Class: Arachnida
- Order: Araneae
- Infraorder: Araneomorphae
- Family: Linyphiidae
- Genus: Vagiphantes; Saaristo & Tanasevitch, 2004
- Species: V. vaginatus

Binomial name
- Vagiphantes vaginatus (Tanasevitch, 1983)

Genus of spiders

Vagiphantes is a monotypic genus of Asian sheet weavers containing the single species, Vagiphantes vaginatus. It was first described by Michael I. Saaristo & A. V. Tanasevitch in 2004, and is only found in Asia.
