= Pseudocarorita =

Scientific classification
- Kingdom: Animalia
- Phylum: Arthropoda
- Subphylum: Chelicerata
- Class: Arachnida
- Order: Araneae
- Infraorder: Araneomorphae
- Family: Linyphiidae
- Genus: Pseudocarorita; Wunderlich, 1980
- Species: P. thaleri

Binomial name
- Pseudocarorita thaleri (Saaristo, 1971)

Genus of spiders

Pseudocarorita is a monotypic genus of European sheet weavers containing the single species, Pseudocarorita thaleri. It was first described by J. Wunderlich in 1980, and has only been found in Central Europe.
