= Spiralophantes =

Scientific classification
- Kingdom: Animalia
- Phylum: Arthropoda
- Subphylum: Chelicerata
- Class: Arachnida
- Order: Araneae
- Infraorder: Araneomorphae
- Family: Linyphiidae
- Genus: Spiralophantes; Tanasevitch & Saaristo, 2006
- Species: S. mirabilis

Binomial name
- Spiralophantes mirabilis Tanasevitch & Saaristo, 2006

Genus of spiders

Spiralophantes is a monotypic genus of Asian sheet weavers containing the single species, Spiralophantes mirabilis. It was first described by A. V. Tanasevitch & Michael I. Saaristo in 2006, and has only been found in Nepal.
