= Australophantes =

Scientific classification
- Kingdom: Animalia
- Phylum: Arthropoda
- Subphylum: Chelicerata
- Class: Arachnida
- Order: Araneae
- Infraorder: Araneomorphae
- Family: Linyphiidae
- Genus: Australophantes; Tanasevitch, 2012
- Species: A. laetesiformis

Binomial name
- Australophantes laetesiformis (Wunderlich, 1976)

Genus of spiders

Australophantes is a monotypic genus of dwarf spiders containing the single species, Australophantes laetesiformis. It was first described by A. V. Tanasevitch & K. Stenchly in 2012, and has only been found in Australia and on Sulawesi.
