= Sachaliphantes =

Scientific classification
- Kingdom: Animalia
- Phylum: Arthropoda
- Subphylum: Chelicerata
- Class: Arachnida
- Order: Araneae
- Infraorder: Araneomorphae
- Family: Linyphiidae
- Genus: Sachaliphantes; Saaristo & Tanasevitch, 2004
- Species: S. sachalinensis

Binomial name
- Sachaliphantes sachalinensis (Tanasevitch, 1988)

Genus of spiders

Sachaliphantes is a monotypic genus of Asian sheet weavers containing the single species, Sachaliphantes sachalinensis. It was first described by Michael I. Saaristo & A. V. Tanasevitch in 2004, and has only been found in Japan, Korea, China, and Russia.
