= Epigyphantes =

Scientific classification
- Kingdom: Animalia
- Phylum: Arthropoda
- Subphylum: Chelicerata
- Class: Arachnida
- Order: Araneae
- Infraorder: Araneomorphae
- Family: Linyphiidae
- Genus: Epigyphantes; Saaristo & Tanasevitch, 2004
- Species: E. epigynatus

Binomial name
- Epigyphantes epigynatus (Tanasevitch, 1988)

Genus of spiders

Epigyphantes is a monotypic genus of Asian dwarf spiders containing the single species, Epigyphantes epigynatus. It was first described by Michael I. Saaristo & A. V. Tanasevitch in 2004, and has only been found in Russia.
