= Cornicephalus =

Scientific classification
- Kingdom: Animalia
- Phylum: Arthropoda
- Subphylum: Chelicerata
- Class: Arachnida
- Order: Araneae
- Infraorder: Araneomorphae
- Family: Linyphiidae
- Genus: Cornicephalus; Saaristo & Wunderlich, 1995
- Species: C. jilinensis

Binomial name
- Cornicephalus jilinensis Saaristo & Wunderlich, 1995

Genus of spiders

Cornicephalus is a monotypic genus of East Asian dwarf spiders containing the single species, Cornicephalus jilinensis. It was first described by Michael I. Saaristo & J. Wunderlich in 1995, and has only been found in China.
