= Afrophantes =

Scientific classification
- Kingdom: Animalia
- Phylum: Arthropoda
- Subphylum: Chelicerata
- Class: Arachnida
- Order: Araneae
- Infraorder: Araneomorphae
- Family: Linyphiidae
- Subfamily: Micronetinae
- Genus: Afrophantes; Tanasevitch, 2025

Species
- 13, see text

Genus of spiders

Afrophantes is a genus of spiders in the family Linyphiidae.

== Distribution ==
Afrophantes is distributed across East Africa.

== Habitat ==
Spiders of this genus are generally found in mountainous forests, where they prefer humid areas, such as leaf litter or mosses.

== Etymology ==
The genus name is a combination of "Africa" (referring to the Afrotropics), and Lepthyphantes, where several species were grouped previously.

== Taxonomy ==
This genus is a member of the subfamily Micronetinae, and seems to be most similar to Mughiphantes Saaristo et Tanasevitch, 1999.

== Species ==
As of January 2026, this genus includes thirteen species:

- Afrophantes acuminifrons (Bosmans, 1978) – Ethiopia
- Afrophantes biseriatus (Simon & Fage, 1922) – Kenya
  - A. b. infans (Simon & Fage, 1922) – Kenya
- Afrophantes bituberculatus (Bosmans, 1978) – Ethiopia
- Afrophantes bryocola (Tanasevitch, 2025) – Ethiopia
- Afrophantes chilalo (Tanasevitch, 2025) – Ethiopia
- Afrophantes coomansi (Bosmans, 1979) – Kenya
- Afrophantes kekenboschi (Bosmans, 1979) – Kenya
- Afrophantes kenyensis (Bosmans, 1979) – Kenya
- Afrophantes legatus (Tanasevitch, 2025) – Ethiopia
- Afrophantes maesi (Bosmans, 1986) – Cameroon
- Afrophantes obtusicornis (Bosmans, 1979) – Kenya
- Afrophantes tropicalis (Tullgren, 1910) – Tanzania
- Afrophantes tullgreni (Bosmans, 1978) – Tanzania
