= Ceratinella =

Scientific classification
- Kingdom: Animalia
- Phylum: Arthropoda
- Subphylum: Chelicerata
- Class: Arachnida
- Order: Araneae
- Infraorder: Araneomorphae
- Family: Linyphiidae
- Subfamily: Erigoninae
- Genus: Ceratinella; Emerton, 1882

Type species
- C. brevis (Wider, 1834)

Species
- 28, see text

Genus of spiders

Ceratinella is a genus of dwarf spiders that was first described by James Henry Emerton in 1882.

They are very similar to both Ceraticelus and Idionella, and the taxonomy of these spiders may change.

== Species ==
As of January 2026, this genus includes 28 species:

- Ceratinella acerea Chamberlin & Ivie, 1933 – Alaska, Canada, United States
- Ceratinella acutalis Irfan, Zhang & Peng, 2022 – China
- Ceratinella alaskae Chamberlin & Ivie, 1947 – Russia (Middle Siberia, Far East), Alaska, Canada, United States
- Ceratinella alaskana Chamberlin, 1949 – Alaska, Canada
- Ceratinella apollonii Caporiacco, 1938 – Italy
- Ceratinella brevipes (Westring, 1851) – Europe, Caucasus, Russia (Europe to South Siberia), Japan
- Ceratinella brevis (Wider, 1834) – Europe, Russia (Europe to Far East), Caucasus, Turkey, Iran, Central Asia, China, Korea, Japan
- Ceratinella brunnea Emerton, 1882 – Alaska, Canada, United States
- Ceratinella buna Chamberlin, 1949 – Canada, United States
- Ceratinella diversa Chamberlin, 1949 – United States
- Ceratinella fumifera Saito, 1939 – Japan
- Ceratinella hemetha Chamberlin, 1949 – United States
- Ceratinella holocerea Chamberlin, 1949 – United States
- Ceratinella kenaba Chamberlin, 1949 – United States
- Ceratinella kurenshchikovi Marusik & Gnelitsa, 2009 – Russia (Far East)
- Ceratinella major Kulczyński, 1894 – Europe
- Ceratinella ornatula (Crosby & Bishop, 1925) – Alaska, Canada, United States, Greenland
- Ceratinella parvula (Fox, 1891) – Canada, United States
- Ceratinella plancyi (Simon, 1880) – China
- Ceratinella playa Cokendolpher, Torrence, Smith & Dupérré, 2007 – United States
- Ceratinella rosea Oliger, 1985 – Russia (Far East)
- Ceratinella scabrosa (O. Pickard-Cambridge, 1871) – Europe, Turkey, Caucasus, Russia (Europe to Far East)
- Ceratinella sibirica Strand, 1903 – Russia (Middle Siberia)
- Ceratinella subulata Bösenberg & Strand, 1906 – Japan
- Ceratinella sydneyensis Wunderlich, 1976 – Australia (New South Wales)
- Ceratinella tigana Chamberlin, 1949 – Alaska
- Ceratinella tosior Chamberlin, 1949 – United States
- Ceratinella wideri (Thorell, 1871) – Europe, Russia (Europe to Far East), Central Asia
