= Mughiphantes =

Scientific classification
- Kingdom: Animalia
- Phylum: Arthropoda
- Subphylum: Chelicerata
- Class: Arachnida
- Order: Araneae
- Infraorder: Araneomorphae
- Family: Linyphiidae
- Genus: Mughiphantes; Saaristo & Tanasevitch, 1999

Type species
- M. mughi (Fickert, 1875)

Species
- 60, see text

Genus of spiders

Mughiphantes is a genus of dwarf spiders that was first described by Michael I. Saaristo & A. V. Tanasevitch in 1999.

== Species ==
As of May 2019 it contains sixty species:

- M. aculifer (Tanasevitch, 1988) – Russia
- M. afghanus (Denis, 1958) – Afghanistan
- M. alticola (Tanasevitch, 1987) – Nepal
- M. anachoretus (Tanasevitch, 1987) – Nepal
- M. ancoriformis (Tanasevitch, 1987) – Nepal
- M. arlaudi (Denis, 1954) – France
- M. armatus (Kulczyński, 1905) – Central Europe
- M. baebleri (Lessert, 1910) – Alps (France, Italy, Switzerland, Austria, Slovenia)
- M. beishanensis Tanasevitch, 2006 – China
- M. bicornis Tanasevitch & Saaristo, 2006 – Nepal
- M. brunneri (Thaler, 1984) – Italy
- M. carnicus (van Helsdingen, 1982) – Italy
- M. cornutus (Schenkel, 1927) – Europe, Turkey, Russia (Europe to South Siberia), Kazakhstan
- M. cuspidatus Tanasevitch & Saaristo, 2006 – Nepal
- M. edentulus Tanasevitch, 2010 – United Arab Emirates
- M. falxus Tanasevitch & Saaristo, 2006 – Nepal
- M. faustus (Tanasevitch, 1987) – Nepal
- M. hadzii (Miller & Polenec, 1975) – Austria, Slovenia
- M. handschini (Schenkel, 1919) – Central Europe
- M. hindukuschensis (Miller & Buchar, 1972) – Afghanistan
- M. ignavus (Simon, 1884) – France
- M. inermus Tanasevitch & Saaristo, 2006 – Nepal
- M. jaegeri Tanasevitch, 2006 – China
- M. johannislupi (Denis, 1953) – France
- M. jugorum (Denis, 1954) – France
- M. lithoclasicola (Deltshev, 1983) – Bulgaria
- M. logunovi Tanasevitch, 2000 – Russia
- M. longiproper Tanasevitch & Saaristo, 2006 – Nepal
- M. martensi Tanasevitch, 2006 – China
- M. marusiki (Tanasevitch, 1988) – Russia, Mongolia
- M. merretti (Millidge, 1975) – Italy
- M. mughi (Fickert, 1875) (type) – Europe, Russia
- M. nigromaculatus (Zhu & Wen, 1983) – Russia, China
- M. numilionis (Tanasevitch, 1987) – Nepal
- M. occultus (Tanasevitch, 1987) – Nepal
- M. omega (Denis, 1952) – Romania
- M. ovtchinnikovi (Tanasevitch, 1989) – Kyrgyzstan
- M. pulcher (Kulczyński, 1881) – Central Europe
- M. pulcheroides (Wunderlich, 1985) – Italy
- M. pyrenaeus (Denis, 1953) – France
- M. restrictus Tanasevitch & Saaristo, 2006 – Nepal
- M. rotundatus (Tanasevitch, 1987) – Nepal
- M. rupium (Thaler, 1984) – Germany, Austria
- M. setifer (Tanasevitch, 1987) – Nepal
- M. setosus Tanasevitch & Saaristo, 2006 – Nepal
- M. severus (Thaler, 1990) – Austria
- M. sherpa (Tanasevitch, 1987) – Nepal
- M. sobrioides Tanasevitch, 2000 – Russia
- M. sobrius (Thorell, 1871) – Norway (Svalbard), Russia (Europe, Siberia)
- M. styriacus (Thaler, 1984) – Austria
- M. suffusus (Strand, 1901) – Scandinavia, Russia
- M. taczanowskii (O. Pickard-Cambridge, 1873) – Russia, Mongolia
- M. tienschangensis (Tanasevitch, 1986) – Central Asia
- M. triglavensis (Miller & Polenec, 1975) – Austria, Slovenia
- M. variabilis (Kulczyński, 1887) – Central Europe
- M. varians (Kulczyński, 1882) – Eastern Europe
- M. vittatus (Spassky, 1941) – Central Asia
- M. whymperi (F. O. Pickard-Cambridge, 1894) – Ireland, Britain, Scandinavia, Russia
- M. yadongensis (Hu, 2001) – China
- M. yeti (Tanasevitch, 1987) – Nepal
