= Decipiphantes =

Scientific classification
- Kingdom: Animalia
- Phylum: Arthropoda
- Subphylum: Chelicerata
- Class: Arachnida
- Order: Araneae
- Infraorder: Araneomorphae
- Family: Linyphiidae
- Genus: Decipiphantes; Saaristo & Tanasevitch, 1996
- Species: D. decipiens

Binomial name
- Decipiphantes decipiens (L. Koch, 1879)

Genus of spiders

Decipiphantes is a monotypic genus of dwarf spiders containing the species Decipiphantes decipiens. It was first described by Michael I. Saaristo & A. V. Tanasevitch in 1996, and has only been found in Belarus, Kazakhstan, Mongolia, and Russia.
