= Obscuriphantes =

Scientific classification
- Kingdom: Animalia
- Phylum: Arthropoda
- Subphylum: Chelicerata
- Class: Arachnida
- Order: Araneae
- Infraorder: Araneomorphae
- Family: Linyphiidae
- Genus: Obscuriphantes; Saaristo & Tanasevitch, 2000

Type species
- O. obscurus (Blackwall, 1841)

Species
- 3, see text

Genus of spiders

Obscuriphantes is a genus of dwarf spiders that was first described by Michael I. Saaristo & A. V. Tanasevitch in 2000.

== Species ==
As of May 2019 it contains three species and one subspecies:

- Obscuriphantes bacelarae (Schenkel, 1938) – Portugal, Spain, France
- Obscuriphantes obscurus (Blackwall, 1841) (type) – Europe, Turkey, Caucasus, Russia (Europe to West Siberia), China
  - Obscuriphantes o. dilutior (Simon, 1929) – France
- Obscuriphantes pseudoobscurus (Marusik, Hippa & Koponen, 1996) – Russia (Middle Siberia to Far East), Kazakhstan
