= Formiphantes =

Scientific classification
- Kingdom: Animalia
- Phylum: Arthropoda
- Subphylum: Chelicerata
- Class: Arachnida
- Order: Araneae
- Infraorder: Araneomorphae
- Family: Linyphiidae
- Genus: Formiphantes; Saaristo & Tanasevitch, 1996
- Species: F. lephthyphantiformis

Binomial name
- Formiphantes lephthyphantiformis (Strand, 1907)

Genus of spiders

Formiphantes is a monotypic genus of dwarf spiders containing the single species, Formiphantes lephthyphantiformis. It was first described by Michael I. Saaristo & A. V. Tanasevitch in 1996.
