= Ascetophantes =

Scientific classification
- Kingdom: Animalia
- Phylum: Arthropoda
- Subphylum: Chelicerata
- Class: Arachnida
- Order: Araneae
- Infraorder: Araneomorphae
- Family: Linyphiidae
- Genus: Ascetophantes; Tanasevitch & Saaristo, 2006
- Species: A. asceticus

Binomial name
- Ascetophantes asceticus (Tanasevitch, 1987)

Genus of spiders

Ascetophantes is a monotypic genus of Asian dwarf spiders containing the single species, Ascetophantes asceticus. It was first described by A. V. Tanasevitch & Michael I. Saaristo in 2006, and has only been found in Nepal.
