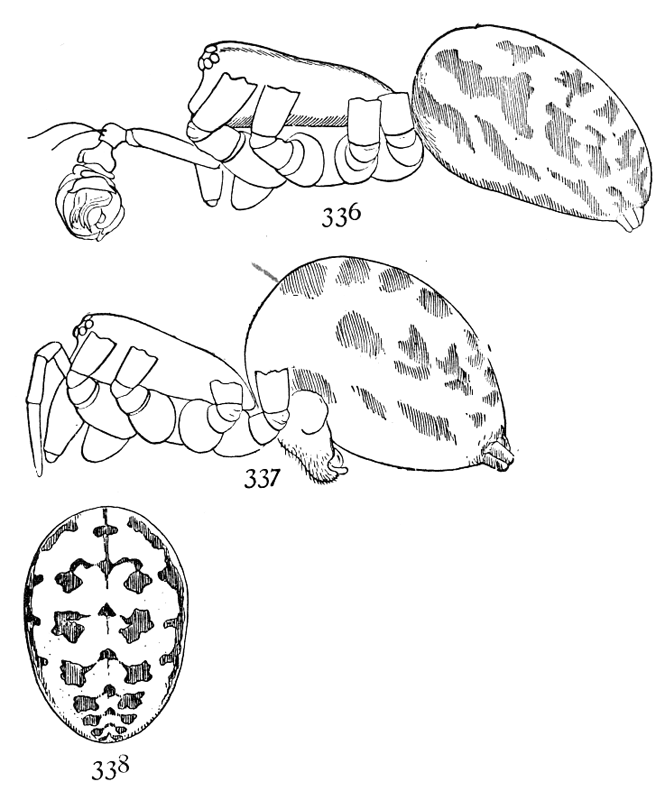
- M. nebulosus

Scientific classification
- Kingdom: Animalia
- Phylum: Arthropoda
- Subphylum: Chelicerata
- Class: Arachnida
- Order: Araneae
- Infraorder: Araneomorphae
- Family: Linyphiidae
- Genus: Megalepthyphantes; Wunderlich, 1994

Type species
- M. nebulosus (Sundevall, 1830)

Species
- 17, see text

= Megalepthyphantes =

Genus of spiders

Megalepthyphantes is a genus of dwarf spiders that was first described by J. Wunderlich in 1994.

== Species ==
As of May 2019 it contains seventeen species:

- Megalepthyphantes auresensis Bosmans, 2006 – Algeria
- Megalepthyphantes bkheitae (Bosmans & Bouragba, 1992) – Algeria
- Megalepthyphantes brignolii Tanasevitch, 2014 – Morocco
- Megalepthyphantes camelus (Tanasevitch, 1990) – Iran, Azerbaijan
- Megalepthyphantes collinus (L. Koch, 1872) – Europe
- Megalepthyphantes globularis Tanasevitch, 2011 – Turkey
- Megalepthyphantes hellinckxorum Bosmans, 2006 – Algeria
- Megalepthyphantes kandahar Tanasevitch, 2009 – Afghanistan
- Megalepthyphantes kronebergi (Tanasevitch, 1989) – Iran, Kazakhstan to China
- Megalepthyphantes kuhitangensis (Tanasevitch, 1989) – Israel, Central Asia, China
- Megalepthyphantes lydiae Wunderlich, 1994 – Greece
- Megalepthyphantes minotaur Tanasevitch & Wunderlich, 2015 – Greece (Crete)
- Megalepthyphantes nebulosoides (Wunderlich, 1977) – Iran, Central Asia
- Megalepthyphantes nebulosus (Sundevall, 1830) (type) – North America, Europe, Turkey, Caucasus, Russia (European to Far East)
- Megalepthyphantes pseudocollinus Saaristo, 1997 – Europe, Russia (Europe to West Siberia), Caucasus, Turkey, Iran
- Megalepthyphantes turkestanicus (Tanasevitch, 1989) – Turkmenistan, Afghanistan, China
- Megalepthyphantes turkeyensis Tanasevitch, Kunt & Seyyar, 2005 – Cyprus, Turkey
