= Piniphantes =

Scientific classification
- Kingdom: Animalia
- Phylum: Arthropoda
- Subphylum: Chelicerata
- Class: Arachnida
- Order: Araneae
- Infraorder: Araneomorphae
- Family: Linyphiidae
- Genus: Piniphantes; Saaristo & Tanasevitch, 1996

Type species
- P. pinicola (Simon, 1884)

Species
- 9, see text

Genus of spiders

Piniphantes is a genus of dwarf spiders that was first described by Michael I. Saaristo & A. V. Tanasevitch in 1996.

== Species ==
As of May 2019 it contains nine species:

- Piniphantes agnellus (Maurer & Thaler, 1988) – France, Italy
- Piniphantes cinereus (Tanasevitch, 1986) – Kyrgyzstan
- Piniphantes cirratus (Thaler, 1986) – France (Corsica)
- Piniphantes himalayensis (Tanasevitch, 1987) – Nepal, Pakistan
- Piniphantes macer (Tanasevitch, 1986) – Kyrgyzstan
- Piniphantes pinicola (Simon, 1884) (type) – Europe, Turkey, Caucasus, Turkmenistan
- Piniphantes plumatus (Tanasevitch, 1986) – Kyrgyzstan
- Piniphantes uzbekistanicus (Tanasevitch, 1983) – Uzbekistan, Kyrgyzstan
- Piniphantes zonsteini (Tanasevitch, 1989) – Uzbekistan, Kyrgyzstan
