= Flagelliphantes =

Scientific classification
- Kingdom: Animalia
- Phylum: Arthropoda
- Subphylum: Chelicerata
- Class: Arachnida
- Order: Araneae
- Infraorder: Araneomorphae
- Family: Linyphiidae
- Genus: Flagelliphantes; Saaristo & Tanasevitch, 1996

Type species
- F. flagellifer (Tanasevitch, 1988)

Species
- F. bergstromi (Schenkel, 1931); F. flagellifer (Tanasevitch, 1988); F. sterneri (Eskov & Marusik, 1994); F. yunxia (Yang, Yao, Irfan et He, 2023)

Genus of spiders

Flagelliphantes is a genus of dwarf spiders that was first described by Michael I. Saaristo & A. V. Tanasevitch in 1996. It was originally erected to contain three species, all found in Russia: F. bergstromi, F. flagellifer, and F. sterneri. In 2023, F. yunxia from Jilin province, China was assigned to this genus.
