= Caviphantes =

Scientific classification
- Kingdom: Animalia
- Phylum: Arthropoda
- Subphylum: Chelicerata
- Class: Arachnida
- Order: Araneae
- Infraorder: Araneomorphae
- Family: Linyphiidae
- Genus: Caviphantes; Oi, 1960

Type species
- C. samensis Oi, 1960

Species
- 5, see text

Synonyms
- Lessertiella Dumitrescu & Miller, 1962; Maxillodens Zhu & Zhou, 1992

Genus of spiders

Caviphantes is a genus of dwarf spiders that was first described by R. Oi in 1960.

== Species ==
As of May 2019 it contains five species:

- Caviphantes dobrogicus (Dumitrescu & Miller, 1962) – Romania to Central Asia
- Caviphantes flagellatus (Zhu & Zhou, 1992) – China
- Caviphantes pseudosaxetorum Wunderlich, 1979 – Lebanon to India, Nepal, China, Russia (Kurile Is.), Japan
- Caviphantes samensis Oi, 1960 (type) – China, Japan
- Caviphantes saxetorum (Hull, 1916) – USA, Europe, Russia (Urals, South Siberia)
