= Notiogyne =

Scientific classification
- Kingdom: Animalia
- Phylum: Arthropoda
- Subphylum: Chelicerata
- Class: Arachnida
- Order: Araneae
- Infraorder: Araneomorphae
- Family: Linyphiidae
- Genus: Notiogyne; Tanasevitch, 2007
- Species: N. falcata

Binomial name
- Notiogyne falcata Tanasevitch, 2007

Genus of spiders

Notiogyne is a monotypic genus of Asian dwarf spiders containing the single species, Notiogyne falcata. It was first described by A. V. Tanasevitch in 2007, and has only been found in Russia.
