= Spermophorides lascars =

Conservation status
- Critically Endangered (IUCN 3.1)

Scientific classification
- Kingdom: Animalia
- Phylum: Arthropoda
- Subphylum: Chelicerata
- Class: Arachnida
- Order: Araneae
- Infraorder: Araneomorphae
- Family: Pholcidae
- Genus: Spermophorides
- Species: S. lascars

Binomial name
- Spermophorides lascars Saaristo, 2001

Species of spider

Spermophorides lascars is a species of spiders of the family Pholcidae. The species is endemic to Silhouette Island of Seychelles.
