= Abiskoa =

Scientific classification
- Kingdom: Animalia
- Phylum: Arthropoda
- Subphylum: Chelicerata
- Class: Arachnida
- Order: Araneae
- Infraorder: Araneomorphae
- Family: Linyphiidae
- Genus: Abiskoa; Saaristo & Tanasevitch, 2000
- Species: A. abiskoensis

Binomial name
- Abiskoa abiskoensis (Holm, 1945)

Synonyms
- Lepthyphantes abiskoensis Holm, 1945; Lepthyphantes haniensis Zhu, Wen & Sun, 1986

Genus of spiders

Abiskoa is a monotypic genus of sheet weavers containing the single species, Abiskoa abiskoensis. The species was first described by Å. Holm in 1945 as Lepthyphantes abiskoensis. In 2000, Michael I. Saaristo and A. V. Tanasevitch moved it to the new genus Abiskoa. It has been recorded from Scandinavia, Poland, Russia (from European Russia to the Far East) and China.

== Taxonomy ==
Å. Holm described the species in 1945 as Lepthyphantes abiskoensis. When Saaristo and Tanasevitch established Abiskoa in 2000, they made it the type species and only member of the new genus. They described the genus name as an anagram derived from abiskoensis, the specific epithet of the type species. In 1992, Tanasevitch concluded that Lepthyphantes haniensis, described by Zhu, Wen and Sun in 1986, was the same species, so that name is now treated as a synonym. The male holotype and the female allotype are held at the Zoological Museum of Uppsala University, Sweden.

== Description ==
Males and females both have a body length of 2.2 to 3 mm. The front part of the body (the prosoma) is yellow-brown with a narrow grey margin, and the legs are also yellow-brown. The abdomen is grey, with pale stripes along the sides and transverse stripes across the back.

== Distribution and habitat ==
The species has been recorded from Scandinavia, Poland, Russia (from European Russia to the Far East) and China. It occurs in a range of vegetation types, favouring the lower layers.
