= Ipaoides =

Scientific classification
- Kingdom: Animalia
- Phylum: Arthropoda
- Subphylum: Chelicerata
- Class: Arachnida
- Order: Araneae
- Infraorder: Araneomorphae
- Family: Linyphiidae
- Genus: Ipaoides; Tanasevitch, 2008
- Species: I. saaristoi

Binomial name
- Ipaoides saaristoi Tanasevitch, 2008

Genus of spiders

Ipaoides is a monotypic genus of East Asian dwarf spiders containing the single species, Ipaoides saaristoi. It was first described by A. V. Tanasevitch in 2008, and has only been found in China.
