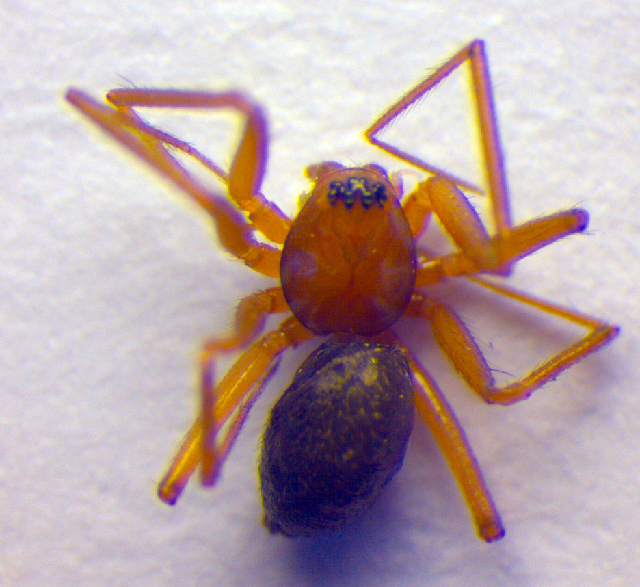
- A. angulipalpis

Scientific classification
- Kingdom: Animalia
- Phylum: Arthropoda
- Subphylum: Chelicerata
- Class: Arachnida
- Order: Araneae
- Infraorder: Araneomorphae
- Family: Linyphiidae
- Genus: Anguliphantes; Saaristo & Tanasevitch, 1996

Type species
- A. angulipalpis (Westring, 1851)

Species
- 16, see text

= Anguliphantes =

Genus of spiders

Anguliphantes is a genus of dwarf spiders that was first described by Michael I. Saaristo and A. V. Tanasevitch in 1996.

== Species ==
As of May 2019 it contains sixteen species:

- Anguliphantes angulipalpis (Westring, 1851) (type) – Europe, Russia (Europe to West Siberia)
- Anguliphantes cerinus (L. Koch, 1879) – Russia (West to South Siberia), Kazakhstan
- Anguliphantes curvus (Tanasevitch, 1992) – Russia (Sakhalin)
- Anguliphantes dybowskii (O. Pickard-Cambridge, 1873) – Russia (Urals to Far East), Mongolia
- Anguliphantes karpinskii (O. Pickard-Cambridge, 1873) – Russia (Middle Siberia to Far East), Mongolia, China
- Anguliphantes maritimus (Tanasevitch, 1988) – Russia (Far East), China
- Anguliphantes monticola (Kulczyński, 1881) – Europe
- Anguliphantes nasus (Paik, 1965) – China, Korea
- Anguliphantes nepalensis (Tanasevitch, 1987) – India, Nepal, Pakistan
- Anguliphantes nepalensoides Tanasevitch, 2011 – India
- Anguliphantes ryvkini Tanasevitch, 2006 – Russia (Far East)
- Anguliphantes sibiricus (Tanasevitch, 1986) – Russia (West to South Siberia)
- Anguliphantes silli (Weiss, 1987) – Romania
- Anguliphantes tripartitus (Miller & Svaton, 1978) – Central Europe
- Anguliphantes ussuricus (Tanasevitch, 1988) – Russia (Far East)
- Anguliphantes zygius (Tanasevitch, 1993) – Russia (Far East), China
