= Tanasevitchia =

Scientific classification
- Kingdom: Animalia
- Phylum: Arthropoda
- Subphylum: Chelicerata
- Class: Arachnida
- Order: Araneae
- Infraorder: Araneomorphae
- Family: Linyphiidae
- Genus: Tanasevitchia; Marusik & Saaristo, 1999

Type species
- T. uralensis (Tanasevitch, 1983)

Species
- T. strandi (Ermolajev, 1937) – Russia; T. uralensis (Tanasevitch, 1983) – Russia

Genus of spiders

Tanasevitchia is a genus of Asian sheet weavers that was first described by Y. M. Marusik & Michael I. Saaristo in 1999. As of May 2019 it contains only two species, both found in Russia: T. strandi and T. uralensis.
