= Maculoncus =

Scientific classification
- Kingdom: Animalia
- Phylum: Arthropoda
- Subphylum: Chelicerata
- Class: Arachnida
- Order: Araneae
- Infraorder: Araneomorphae
- Family: Linyphiidae
- Genus: Maculoncus; Wunderlich, 1995

Type species
- M. parvipalpus Wunderlich, 1995

Species
- M. obscurus Tanasevitch, Ponomarev & Chumachenko, 2016 – Russia (Caucasus), Georgia; M. orientalis Tanasevitch, 2011 – Taiwan; M. parvipalpus Wunderlich, 1995 – Greece (incl. Crete), Israel

Genus of spiders

Maculoncus is a genus of dwarf spiders that was first described by J. Wunderlich in 1995. As of May 2019 it contains only three species, found in Georgia, Greece, Israel, Russia, and Taiwan: M. obscurus, M. orientalis, and M. parvipalpus.
