= Asiagone =

Scientific classification
- Kingdom: Animalia
- Phylum: Arthropoda
- Subphylum: Chelicerata
- Class: Arachnida
- Order: Araneae
- Infraorder: Araneomorphae
- Family: Linyphiidae
- Genus: Asiagone; Tanasevitch

Species
- Asiagone komannai Tanasevitch, 2017; Asiagone perforata Tanasevitch, 2014; Asiagone siama Tanasevitch, 2014; Asiagone signifera Tanasevitch, 2014

Genus of spiders

Asiagone is a genus of spiders in the family Linyphiidae. It was first described in 2014 by Tanasevitch. As of 2017, it contains 4 species, all from Asia.
