= Cinetata =

Scientific classification
- Kingdom: Animalia
- Phylum: Arthropoda
- Subphylum: Chelicerata
- Class: Arachnida
- Order: Araneae
- Infraorder: Araneomorphae
- Family: Linyphiidae
- Genus: Cinetata; Wunderlich, 1995
- Species: C. gradata

Binomial name
- Cinetata gradata (Simon, 1881)

Genus of spiders

Cinetata is a monotypic genus of dwarf spiders containing the single species, Cinetata gradata. It was first described by J. Wunderlich in 1995, and has only been found in Georgia.
