= Bisetifer =

Scientific classification
- Kingdom: Animalia
- Phylum: Arthropoda
- Subphylum: Chelicerata
- Class: Arachnida
- Order: Araneae
- Infraorder: Araneomorphae
- Family: Linyphiidae
- Genus: Bisetifer; Tanasevitch, 1987

Type species
- B. cephalotus Tanasevitch, 1987

Species
- B. cephalotus Tanasevitch, 1987 – Ukraine, Russia (Caucasus); B. gruzin Tanasevitch, Ponomarev & Chumachenko, 2015 – Caucasus (Russia, Georgia, Azerbaijan)

Genus of spiders

Bisetifer is a genus of dwarf spiders that was first described by A. V. Tanasevitch in 1987. As of May 2019 it contains only two species: B. cephalotus and B. gruzin.
