= Himalafurca =

Scientific classification
- Kingdom: Animalia
- Phylum: Arthropoda
- Subphylum: Chelicerata
- Class: Arachnida
- Order: Araneae
- Infraorder: Araneomorphae
- Family: Linyphiidae
- Genus: Himalafurca; Tanasevitch, 2021

Type species
- H. martensi Tanasevitch, 2021

Species
- Himalafurca martensi Tanasevitch, 2021; Himalafurca schawalleri Tanasevitch, 2021

Genus of spiders

Himalafurca is a small genus of south Asian sheet weavers. It was first described by A. V. Tanasevitch in 2021, and it has only been found in Nepal. As of December 2021 it contains only two species: H. martensi and H. schawalleri.
