= Afrotrichona =

Scientific classification
- Kingdom: Animalia
- Phylum: Arthropoda
- Subphylum: Chelicerata
- Class: Arachnida
- Order: Araneae
- Infraorder: Araneomorphae
- Family: Linyphiidae
- Genus: Afrotrichona; Tanasevitch, 2020
- Species: A. mahnerti

Binomial name
- Afrotrichona mahnerti Tanasevitch, 2020

Genus of spiders

Afrotrichona is a monotypic genus of East African sheet weavers containing the single species, Afrotrichona mahnerti. It was first described by A. V. Tanasevitch in 2020, and it has only been found in Kenya.
