= Scutpelecopsis =

Scientific classification
- Kingdom: Animalia
- Phylum: Arthropoda
- Subphylum: Chelicerata
- Class: Arachnida
- Order: Araneae
- Infraorder: Araneomorphae
- Family: Linyphiidae
- Genus: Scutpelecopsis; Marusik & Gnelitsa, 2009

Type species
- S. wunderlichi Marusik & Gnelitsa, 2009

Species
- 5, see text

Genus of spiders

Scutpelecopsis is a genus of sheet weavers that was first described by Y. M. Marusik & V. A. Gnelitsa in 2009.

== Species ==
As of May 2019 it contains five species:

- Scutpelecopsis krausi (Wunderlich, 1980) – SE Europe (Balkans) to Armenia
- Scutpelecopsis loricata Duma & Tanasevitch, 2011 – Romania
- Scutpelecopsis media Wunderlich, 2011 – Turkey
- Scutpelecopsis procer Wunderlich, 2011 – Iran
- Scutpelecopsis wunderlichi Marusik & Gnelitsa, 2009 (type) – Georgia
