= Taibainus =

Scientific classification
- Kingdom: Animalia
- Phylum: Arthropoda
- Subphylum: Chelicerata
- Class: Arachnida
- Order: Araneae
- Infraorder: Araneomorphae
- Family: Linyphiidae
- Genus: Taibainus; Tanasevitch, 2006
- Species: T. shanensis

Binomial name
- Taibainus shanensis Tanasevitch, 2006

Genus of spiders

Taibainus is a monotypic genus of East Asian sheet weavers containing the single species, Taibainus shanensis. It was first described by A. V. Tanasevitch in 2006, and has only been found in China.
