= Algarveneta =

Scientific classification
- Kingdom: Animalia
- Phylum: Arthropoda
- Subphylum: Chelicerata
- Class: Arachnida
- Order: Araneae
- Infraorder: Araneomorphae
- Family: Linyphiidae
- Genus: Algarveneta; Wunderlich, 2021
- Species: A. corona

Binomial name
- Algarveneta corona Wunderlich, 2021

Genus of spiders

Algarveneta is a monotypic genus of southern European sheet weavers containing the single species, Algarveneta corona. It was first described by J. Wunderlich in 2021, and it has only been found in Portugal.
