= Tibiaster =

Scientific classification
- Kingdom: Animalia
- Phylum: Arthropoda
- Subphylum: Chelicerata
- Class: Arachnida
- Order: Araneae
- Infraorder: Araneomorphae
- Family: Linyphiidae
- Genus: Tibiaster; Tanasevitch, 1987

Type species
- T. djanybekensis Tanasevitch, 1987

Species
- 2, see text

Genus of spiders

Tibiaster is a genus of Asian sheet weavers that was first described by A. V. Tanasevitch in 1987.

== Species ==
As of May 2019 it contains only two species.

- Tibiaster djanybekensis Tanasevitch, 1987 – Kazakhstan
- Tibiaster wunderlichi Eskov, 1995 – Kazakhstan
