= Javagone =

Scientific classification
- Kingdom: Animalia
- Phylum: Arthropoda
- Subphylum: Chelicerata
- Class: Arachnida
- Order: Araneae
- Infraorder: Araneomorphae
- Family: Linyphiidae
- Genus: Javagone; Tanasevitch, 2020
- Species: J. maribaya

Binomial name
- Javagone maribaya Tanasevitch, 2020

Genus of spiders

Javagone is a monotypic genus of southeast Asian sheet weavers containing the single species, Javagone maribaya. It was first described by A. V. Tanasevitch in 2020, and it has only been found in Indonesia.

== See also ==
- Javanaria
- Javanyphia
