= Agyphantes =

Scientific classification
- Kingdom: Animalia
- Phylum: Arthropoda
- Subphylum: Chelicerata
- Class: Arachnida
- Order: Araneae
- Infraorder: Araneomorphae
- Family: Linyphiidae
- Genus: Agyphantes; Saaristo & Marusik, 2004

Type species
- A. sakhalinensis Saaristo & Marusik, 2004

Species
- A. sajanensis (Eskov & Marusik, 1994) – Russia (South Siberia); A. sakhalinensis Saaristo & Marusik, 2004 – Russia (Sakhalin)

Genus of spiders

Agyphantes is a genus of Asian dwarf spiders that was first described by Michael I. Saaristo & Y. M. Marusik in 2004. As of May 2019 it contains only two species: A. sajanensis and A. sakhalinensis.
