= Episolder =

Scientific classification
- Kingdom: Animalia
- Phylum: Arthropoda
- Subphylum: Chelicerata
- Class: Arachnida
- Order: Araneae
- Infraorder: Araneomorphae
- Family: Linyphiidae
- Genus: Episolder; Tanasevitch, 1996
- Species: E. finitimus

Binomial name
- Episolder finitimus Tanasevitch, 1996

Genus of spiders

Episolder is a monotypic genus of Asian dwarf spiders containing the single species, Episolder finitimus. It was first described by A. V. Tanasevitch in 1996, and has only been found in Russia.
