= Acorigone =

Scientific classification
- Kingdom: Animalia
- Phylum: Arthropoda
- Subphylum: Chelicerata
- Class: Arachnida
- Order: Araneae
- Infraorder: Araneomorphae
- Family: Linyphiidae
- Genus: Acorigone; Wunderlich, 2008

Type species
- A. zebraneus Wunderlich, 2008

Species
- A. acoreensis (Wunderlich, 1992) – Azores; A. zebraneus Wunderlich, 2008 – Azores

Genus of spiders

Acorigone is a genus of dwarf spiders that was first described by P. A. V. Borges & J. Wunderlich in 2008. As of May 2019 it contains only two species: A. acoreensis and A. zebraneus, both native to the Azores archipelago.
