= Perregrinus =

Scientific classification
- Kingdom: Animalia
- Phylum: Arthropoda
- Subphylum: Chelicerata
- Class: Arachnida
- Order: Araneae
- Infraorder: Araneomorphae
- Family: Linyphiidae
- Genus: Perregrinus; Tanasevitch, 1992
- Species: P. deformis

Binomial name
- Perregrinus deformis (Tanasevitch, 1982)

Genus of spiders

Perregrinus is a monotypic genus of dwarf spiders containing the single species, Perregrinus deformis. It was first described by A. V. Tanasevitch in 1992, and has only been found in Russia, Mongolia, China, and Canada.

The male of this species is readily identifiable by the uniquely-shaped projection issuing from its clypeus. When viewed from the side, this short, rounded projection appears somewhat similar to a human nose.
