= Lamellasia =

Scientific classification
- Kingdom: Animalia
- Phylum: Arthropoda
- Subphylum: Chelicerata
- Class: Arachnida
- Order: Araneae
- Infraorder: Araneomorphae
- Family: Linyphiidae
- Genus: Lamellasia; Tanasevitch

Type species
- Lamellasia mirabilis

Species
- Lamellasia mirabilis Tanasevitch, 2014

Genus of spiders

Lamellasia is a genus of spiders in the family Linyphiidae. It was first described in 2014 by Tanasevitch. As of 2017, it contains only one species, Lamellasia mirabilis, found in Thailand.
