= Knischatiria =

Scientific classification
- Kingdom: Animalia
- Phylum: Arthropoda
- Subphylum: Chelicerata
- Class: Arachnida
- Order: Araneae
- Infraorder: Araneomorphae
- Family: Linyphiidae
- Genus: Knischatiria; Wunderlich, 1976

Type species
- K. abnormis Wunderlich, 1976

Species
- K. abnormis Wunderlich, 1976 – Australia (Queensland); K. longispina Wunderlich, 1995 – Indonesia (Sumatra); K. tuberosa Wunderlich, 1995 – Malaysia

Genus of spiders

Knischatiria is a genus of dwarf spiders that was first described by J. Wunderlich in 1976. As of May 2019 it contains only three species, found in Australia, Indonesia, and Malaysia: K. abnormis, K. longispina, and K. tuberosa.
