= Primerigonina =

Scientific classification
- Kingdom: Animalia
- Phylum: Arthropoda
- Subphylum: Chelicerata
- Class: Arachnida
- Order: Araneae
- Infraorder: Araneomorphae
- Family: Linyphiidae
- Genus: Primerigonina; Wunderlich, 1995
- Species: P. australis

Binomial name
- Primerigonina australis Wunderlich, 1995

Genus of spiders

Primerigonina is a monotypic genus of Central American sheet weavers containing the single species, Primerigonina australis. It was first described by J. Wunderlich in 1995, and has only been found in Panama.
