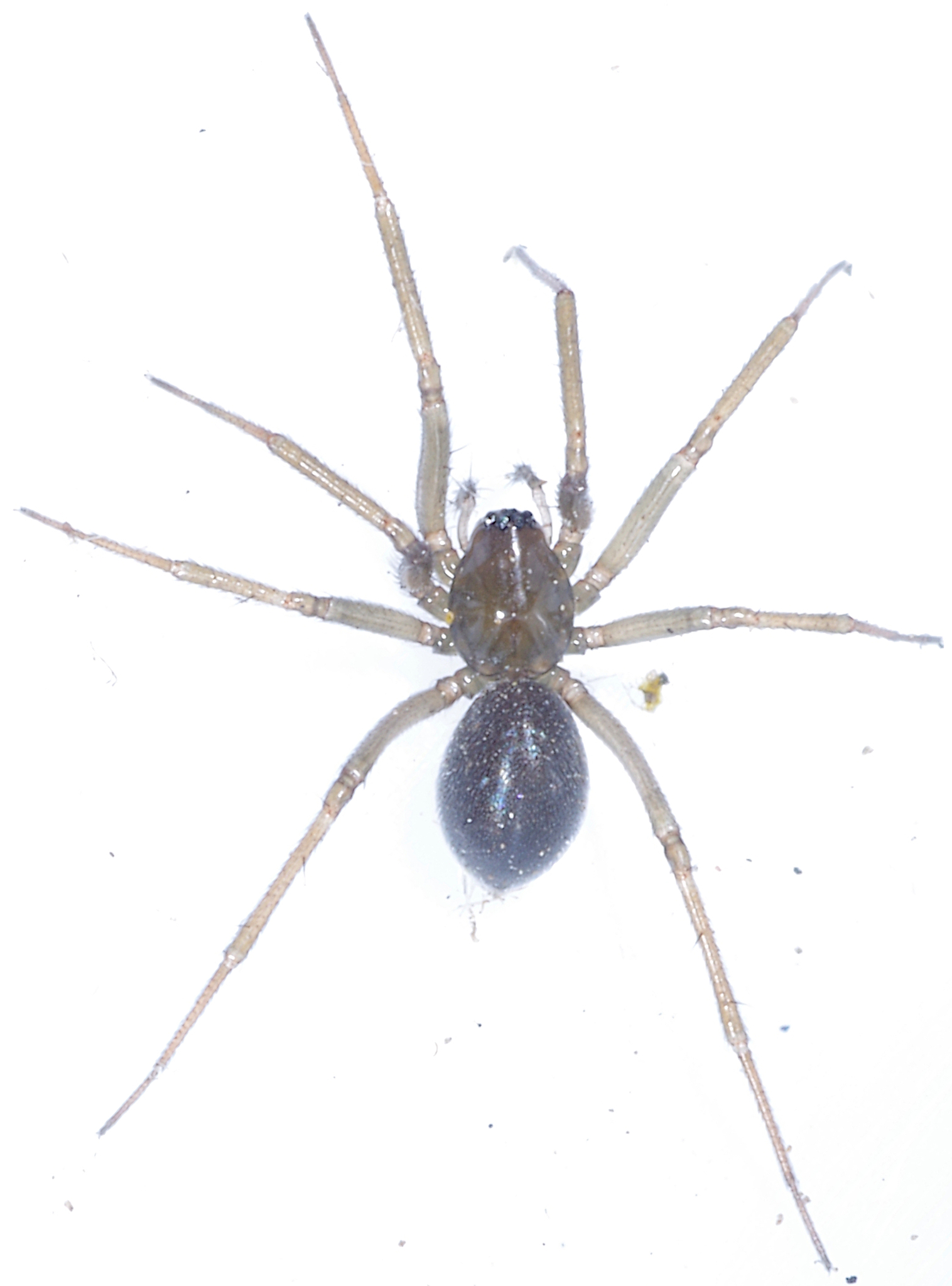
- Tallusia experta

Scientific classification
- Kingdom: Animalia
- Phylum: Arthropoda
- Subphylum: Chelicerata
- Class: Arachnida
- Order: Araneae
- Infraorder: Araneomorphae
- Family: Linyphiidae
- Genus: Tallusia; Lehtinen & Saaristo, 1972

Type species
- T. experta (O. Pickard-Cambridge, 1871)

Species
- 5, see text

= Tallusia =

Genus of spiders

Tallusia is a genus of sheet weavers that was first described by Pekka T. Lehtinen & Michael I. Saaristo in 1972.

== Species ==
As of May 2019, it contains five species, found in Asia:

- Tallusia bicristata Lehtinen & Saaristo, 1972 – Turkey
- Tallusia experta (O. Pickard-Cambridge, 1871) (type) – Europe, Caucasus, Russia to Kazakhstan, Japan
- Tallusia forficala (Zhu & Tu, 1986) – China
- Tallusia pindos Thaler, 1997 – Greece
- Tallusia vindobonensis (Kulczyński, 1898) – Central, Eastern Europe
