= Boreomaro =

Scientific classification
- Kingdom: Animalia
- Phylum: Arthropoda
- Subphylum: Chelicerata
- Class: Arachnida
- Order: Araneae
- Infraorder: Araneomorphae
- Family: Linyphiidae
- Genus: Boreomaro; Tanasevitch, 2022
- Species: B. borealis

Binomial name
- Boreomaro borealis (Eskov, 1991)

Synonyms
- Maro borealis Eskov, 1991

Species of spider

Boreomaro is a monotypic genus of spiders in the family Linyphiidae containing the single species, Boreomaro borealis. It is found from Middle Siberia to the Far East of Russia.

This and related species prefer moist forest habitats of the boreal belt of Eurasia. The abdomen is white to gray, without any distinct pattern. Body length ranges from 1.4 to 1.9 mm.
