= Afribactrus =

Scientific classification
- Kingdom: Animalia
- Phylum: Arthropoda
- Subphylum: Chelicerata
- Class: Arachnida
- Order: Araneae
- Infraorder: Araneomorphae
- Family: Linyphiidae
- Genus: Afribactrus; Wunderlich, 1995
- Species: A. stylifrons

Binomial name
- Afribactrus stylifrons Wunderlich, 1995

Genus of spiders

Afribactrus is a monotypic genus of African dwarf spiders containing the single species, Afribactrus stylifrons. It was first described by J. Wunderlich & V. Nicolai in 1995, and has only been found in South Africa.
