= Protosintula =

Scientific classification
- Kingdom: Animalia
- Phylum: Arthropoda
- Subphylum: Chelicerata
- Class: Arachnida
- Order: Araneae
- Infraorder: Araneomorphae
- Family: Linyphiidae
- Genus: Protosintula; Tanasevitch, 2021
- Species: P. tenebrosus

Binomial name
- Protosintula tenebrosus Tanasevitch, 2021

Species of spider

Protosintula is a monotypic genus of spiders in the family Linyphiidae containing the single species, Protosintula tenebrosus.

The species is only known from one male, which was picked up by hand from under a stone near a building in Central Negev Desert, Israel. It has a body length of 2.2 mm.

== Distribution ==
Protosintula tenebrosus has only been recorded from Israel.

== Etymology ==
The genus is named for its similarity to genus Sintula while having a much simpler palp. The species name (from Latin "dark") refers to the body color.
