= Pseudocyba =

Scientific classification
- Kingdom: Animalia
- Phylum: Arthropoda
- Subphylum: Chelicerata
- Class: Arachnida
- Order: Araneae
- Infraorder: Araneomorphae
- Family: Linyphiidae
- Genus: Pseudocyba; Tanasevitch, 1984
- Species: P. miracula

Binomial name
- Pseudocyba miracula Tanasevitch, 1984

Genus of spiders

Pseudocyba is a monotypic genus of Asian sheet weavers containing the single species, Pseudocyba miracula. It was first described by A. V. Tanasevitch in 1984, and has only been found in Kazakhstan and Russia.
