= Nasoonaria =

Scientific classification
- Kingdom: Animalia
- Phylum: Arthropoda
- Subphylum: Chelicerata
- Class: Arachnida
- Order: Araneae
- Infraorder: Araneomorphae
- Family: Linyphiidae
- Genus: Nasoonaria; Wunderlich & Song, 1995

Type species
- N. sinensis Wunderlich & Song, 1995

Species
- 4, see text

Genus of spiders

Nasoonaria is a genus of Asian dwarf spiders that was first described by J. Wunderlich & D. X. Song in 1995.

== Species ==
As of May 2019 it contains four species:

- Nasoonaria mada Tanasevitch, 2018 – Vietnam
- Nasoonaria magna Tanasevitch, 2014 – China, Laos, Thailand
- Nasoonaria pseudoembolica Tanasevitch, 2019 – Vietnam
- Nasoonaria sinensis Wunderlich & Song, 1995 (type) – China, Laos, Thailand, Indonesia (Sumatra)
