= Australolinyphia =

Scientific classification
- Kingdom: Animalia
- Phylum: Arthropoda
- Subphylum: Chelicerata
- Class: Arachnida
- Order: Araneae
- Infraorder: Araneomorphae
- Family: Linyphiidae
- Genus: Australolinyphia; Wunderlich, 1976
- Species: A. remota

Binomial name
- Australolinyphia remota Wunderlich, 1976

Genus of spiders

Australolinyphia is a monotypic genus of Australian dwarf spiders containing the single species, Australolinyphia remota. It was first described by J. Wunderlich in 1976, and has only been found in Australia.
