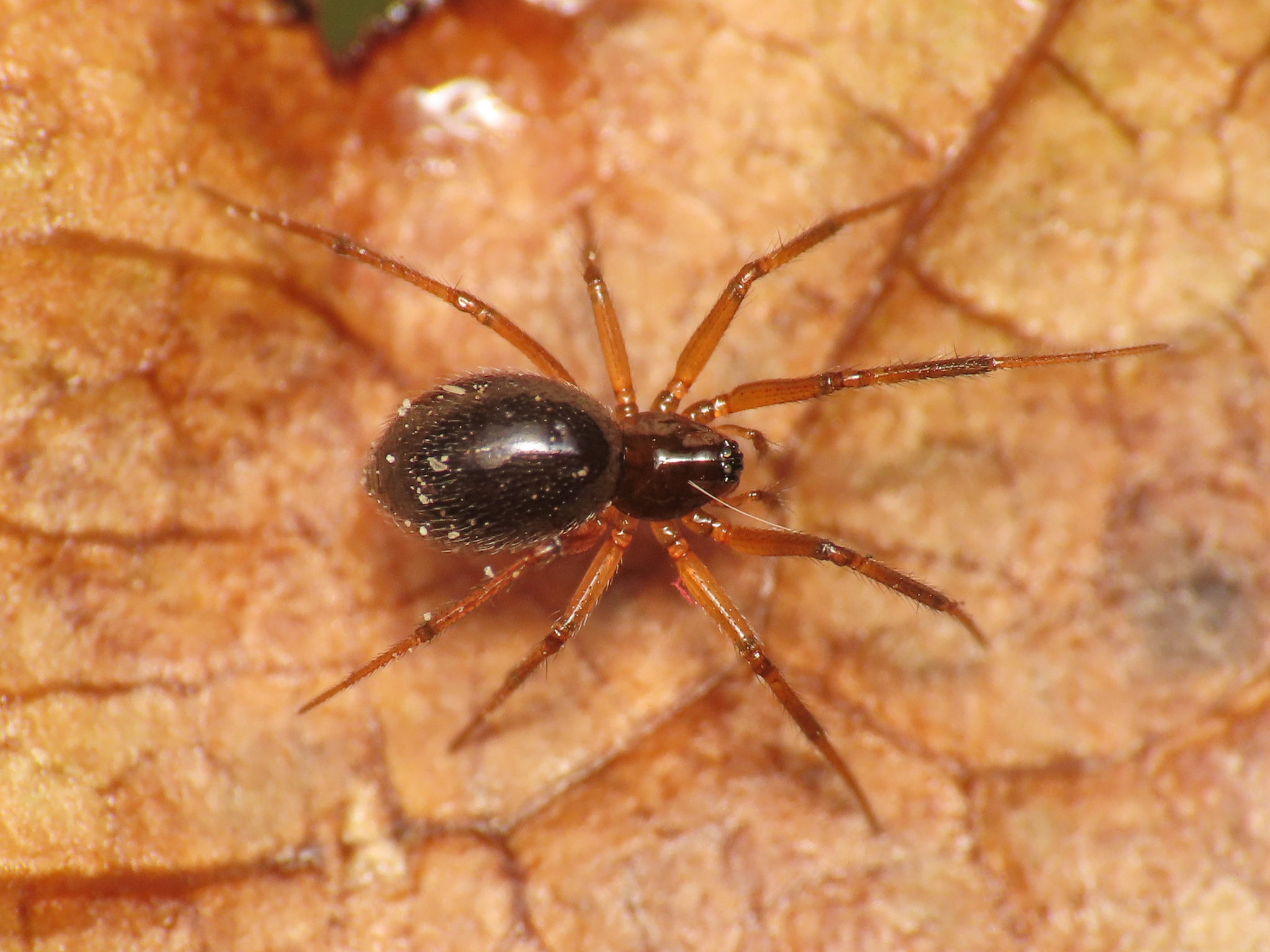
- female S. retroversus in Italy
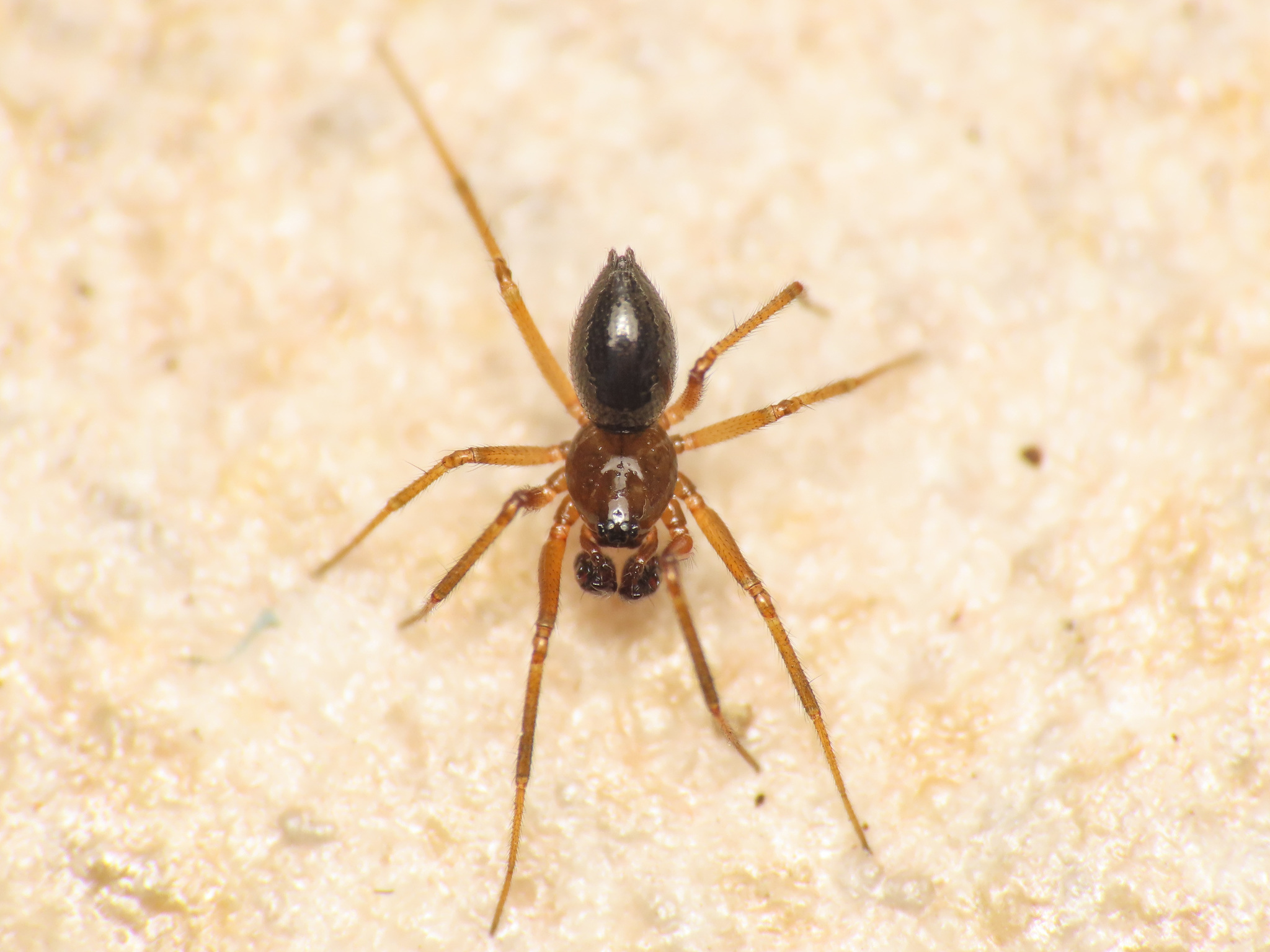
- male S. retroversus in Italy

Scientific classification
- Kingdom: Animalia
- Phylum: Arthropoda
- Subphylum: Chelicerata
- Class: Arachnida
- Order: Araneae
- Infraorder: Araneomorphae
- Family: Linyphiidae
- Genus: Sintula; Simon, 1884

Type species
- S. corniger (Blackwall, 1856)

Species
- 19, see text

= Sintula =

Genus of spiders

Sintula is a genus of sheet weavers that was first described by Eugène Louis Simon in 1884.

== Distribution ==
Spiders in this genus are found in Europe, Russia, and North Africa.

== Species ==
As of January 2026, this genus includes nineteen species:

- Sintula adullam Tanasevitch, 2025 – Israel
- Sintula corniger (Blackwall, 1856) – Europe, Turkey, Caucasus, Iran
- Sintula cretaensis Wunderlich, 1995 – Greece (Crete)
- Sintula cristatus Wunderlich, 1995 – Turkey
- Sintula diceros Simon, 1926 – France, Spain
- Sintula furcifer (Simon, 1912) – Portugal, Spain, France, Morocco, Algeria
- Sintula iberica Bosmans, 2010 – Portugal, Spain
- Sintula karineae Lecigne, 2021 – Turkey, Israel
- Sintula matta Tanasevitch, 2025 – Israel
- Sintula orientalis Bosmans, 1991 – Algeria
- Sintula oseticus Tanasevitch, 1990 – Russia (Caucasus)
- Sintula pecten Wunderlich, 2011 – Canary Islands
- Sintula penicilliger (Simon, 1884) – Algeria
- Sintula pseudocorniger Bosmans, 1991 – Algeria, Tunisia
- Sintula retroversus (O. Pickard-Cambridge, 1875) – Spain to Ukraine and Greece, Turkey, Caucasus, Israel
- Sintula roeweri Kratochvíl, 1935 – Montenegro
- Sintula solitarius Gnelitsa, 2012 – Ukraine
- Sintula spiniger (Balogh, 1935) – Austria to Greece and Russia (Europe)
- Sintula subterminalis Bosmans, 1991 – Algeria

== See also ==
- Protosintula
