= Heterolinyphia =

Scientific classification
- Kingdom: Animalia
- Phylum: Arthropoda
- Subphylum: Chelicerata
- Class: Arachnida
- Order: Araneae
- Infraorder: Araneomorphae
- Family: Linyphiidae
- Genus: Heterolinyphia; Wunderlich, 1973

Type species
- H. tarakotensis Wunderlich, 1973

Species
- H. secunda Thaler, 1999 – Bhutan; H. tarakotensis Wunderlich, 1973 – Nepal, Kashmir

Genus of spiders

Heterolinyphia is a genus of Asian dwarf spiders that was first described by J. Wunderlich in 1973. As of May 2019 it contains only two species, both found in Bhutan, India, and Nepal: H. secunda and H. tarakotensis.
