= Plesiophantes =

Scientific classification
- Kingdom: Animalia
- Phylum: Arthropoda
- Subphylum: Chelicerata
- Class: Arachnida
- Order: Araneae
- Infraorder: Araneomorphae
- Family: Linyphiidae
- Genus: Plesiophantes; Heimer, 1981

Type species
- P. joosti Heimer, 1981

Species
- 3, see text

Genus of spiders

Plesiophantes is a genus of sheet weavers that was first described by S. Heimer in 1981.

== Species ==
As of May 2019 it contains three species:

- Plesiophantes joosti Heimer, 1981 (type) – Russia, Georgia, Turkey
- Plesiophantes simplex Tanasevitch, 1987 – Georgia
- Plesiophantes tanasevitchi Wunderlich, 2011 – Russia
