= Javanaria =

Scientific classification
- Kingdom: Animalia
- Phylum: Arthropoda
- Subphylum: Chelicerata
- Class: Arachnida
- Order: Araneae
- Infraorder: Araneomorphae
- Family: Linyphiidae
- Genus: Javanaria; Tanasevitch, 2020
- Species: J. gracilipes

Binomial name
- Javanaria gracilipes Tanasevitch, 2020

Genus of spiders

Javanaria is a monotypic genus of southeast Asian sheet weavers containing the single species, Javanaria gracilipes. It was first described by A. V. Tanasevitch in 2020, and it has only been found in Indonesia.

== See also ==
- Javagone
- Javanyphia
