= Paracymboides =

Scientific classification
- Kingdom: Animalia
- Phylum: Arthropoda
- Subphylum: Chelicerata
- Class: Arachnida
- Order: Araneae
- Infraorder: Araneomorphae
- Family: Linyphiidae
- Genus: Paracymboides; Tanasevitch, 2011

Type species
- P. tibialis Tanasevitch, 2011

Species
- 2, see text

Genus of spiders

Paracymboides is a genus of Asian dwarf spiders that was first described by A. V. Tanasevitch in 2011.

== Species ==
As of May 2019 it contains two species:

- Paracymboides aduncus Tanasevitch, 2011 – India
- Paracymboides tibialis Tanasevitch, 2011 (type) – India
