= Houshenzinus =

Scientific classification
- Kingdom: Animalia
- Phylum: Arthropoda
- Subphylum: Chelicerata
- Class: Arachnida
- Order: Araneae
- Infraorder: Araneomorphae
- Family: Linyphiidae
- Genus: Houshenzinus; Tanasevitch, 2006

Type species
- H. rimosus Tanasevitch, 2006

Species
- H. rimosus Tanasevitch, 2006 – China; H. tengchongensis Irfan & Peng, 2018 – China; H. xiaolongha Zhao & Li, 2014 – China

Genus of spiders

Houshenzinus is a genus of East Asian dwarf spiders that was first described by A. V. Tanasevitch in 2006. As of May 2019 it contains only three species, found in China: H. rimosus, H. tengchongensis, and H. xiaolongha.
