= Asiafroneta =

Scientific classification
- Kingdom: Animalia
- Phylum: Arthropoda
- Subphylum: Chelicerata
- Class: Arachnida
- Order: Araneae
- Infraorder: Araneomorphae
- Family: Linyphiidae
- Genus: Asiafroneta; Tanasevitch, 2020

Type species
- A. pallida Tanasevitch, 2020

Species
- Asiafroneta atrata Tanasevitch, 2020; Asiafroneta pallida Tanasevitch, 2020

Genus of spiders

Asiafroneta is a small genus of southeast Asian sheet weavers. It was first described by A. V. Tanasevitch in 2020, and it has only been found in Malaysia. As of December 2021 it contains only two species: A. atrata and A. pallida.
