= Caucasopisthes =

Scientific classification
- Kingdom: Animalia
- Phylum: Arthropoda
- Subphylum: Chelicerata
- Class: Arachnida
- Order: Araneae
- Infraorder: Araneomorphae
- Family: Linyphiidae
- Genus: Caucasopisthes; Tanasevitch, 1990
- Species: C. procurvus

Binomial name
- Caucasopisthes procurvus (Tanasevitch, 1987)

Genus of spiders

Caucasopisthes is a monotypic genus of Asian dwarf spiders containing the single species, Caucasopisthes procurvus. It was first described by A. V. Tanasevitch in 1990, and has only been found in Georgia and Russia.
