= Cornitibia =

Scientific classification
- Kingdom: Animalia
- Phylum: Arthropoda
- Subphylum: Chelicerata
- Class: Arachnida
- Order: Araneae
- Infraorder: Araneomorphae
- Family: Linyphiidae
- Genus: Cornitibia; Lin, Lopardo & Uhl, 2022
- Species: C. simplicithorax

Binomial name
- Cornitibia simplicithorax (Tanasevitch, 1998)

Synonyms
- Oedothorax simplicithorax Tanasevitch, 1998

Species of spider

Cornitibia is a monotypic genus of spiders in the family Linyphiidae containing the single species, Cornitibia simplicithorax. It is endemic to Nepal, where it was found in Alnus forest along a river in Ilam District.

The male has a body length of 1.93 mm. The female is unknown.

== Etymology ==
The genus is named after the tusklike male palpal tibia apophysis, from Latin "cornus" ("horn"). The species name refers to the unmodified shape of the male carapace.
