= Heterotrichoncus =

Scientific classification
- Kingdom: Animalia
- Phylum: Arthropoda
- Subphylum: Chelicerata
- Class: Arachnida
- Order: Araneae
- Infraorder: Araneomorphae
- Family: Linyphiidae
- Genus: Heterotrichoncus; Wunderlich, 1970
- Species: H. pusillus

Binomial name
- Heterotrichoncus pusillus (Miller, 1958)

Genus of spiders

Heterotrichoncus is a monotypic genus of dwarf spiders containing the single species, Heterotrichoncus pusillus. It was first described by J. Wunderlich in 1970, and has only been found in Albania, Austria, Czech Republic, France, Russia, Slovakia, and Spain.
