= Birgerius =

Scientific classification
- Kingdom: Animalia
- Phylum: Arthropoda
- Subphylum: Chelicerata
- Class: Arachnida
- Order: Araneae
- Infraorder: Araneomorphae
- Family: Linyphiidae
- Genus: Birgerius; Saaristo, 1973
- Species: B. microps

Binomial name
- Birgerius microps (Simon, 1911)

Genus of spiders

Birgerius is a monotypic genus of European dwarf spiders containing the single species, Birgerius microps. It was first described by Michael I. Saaristo in 1973, and has only been found in France and Spain.
