= Protopalpus =

Scientific classification
- Kingdom: Animalia
- Phylum: Arthropoda
- Subphylum: Chelicerata
- Class: Arachnida
- Order: Araneae
- Infraorder: Araneomorphae
- Family: Linyphiidae
- Genus: Protopalpus; Tanasevitch, 2021
- Species: P. kurku

Binomial name
- Protopalpus kurku Tanasevitch, 2021

Genus of spiders

Protopalpus is a monotypic genus of southeast Asian sheet weavers containing the single species, Protopalpus kurku. It was first described by A. V. Tanasevitch in 2021, and it has only been found in Thailand.
