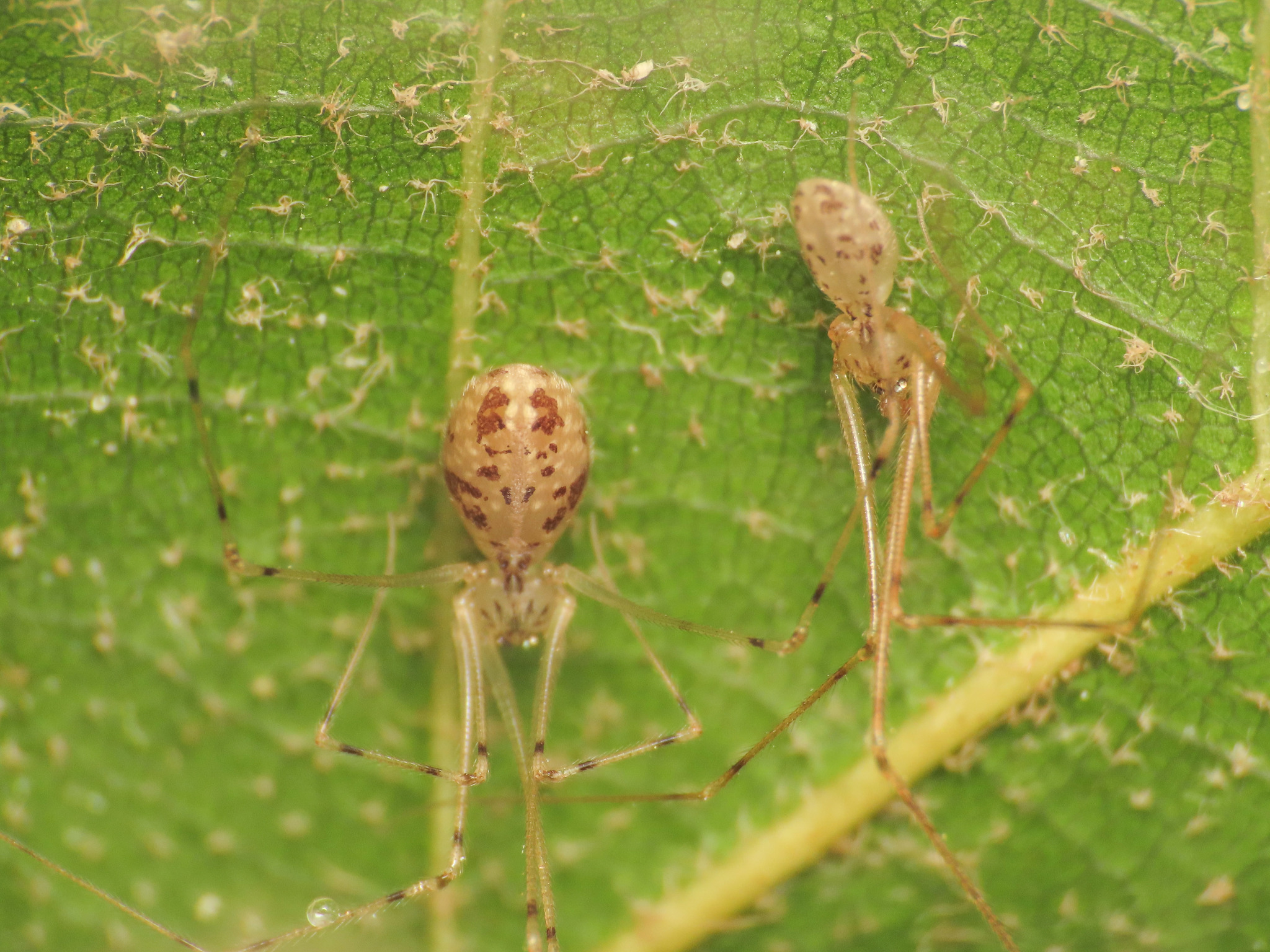

Scientific classification
- Kingdom: Animalia
- Phylum: Arthropoda
- Subphylum: Chelicerata
- Class: Arachnida
- Order: Araneae
- Infraorder: Araneomorphae
- Family: Pholcidae
- Genus: Spermophorides; Wunderlich, 1992

Type species
- S. heterogibbifera (Wunderlich, 1987)

Species
- 34, see text

= Spermophorides =

Genus of spiders

Spermophorides is a genus of cellar spiders that was first described by J. Wunderlich in 1992.

== Species ==
As of June 2019 it contains thirty-four species, found in Africa, Portugal, France, Italy, and Spain:

- Spermophorides africana Huber, 2007 – Tanzania
- Spermophorides anophthalma Wunderlich, 1999 – Canary Is.
- Spermophorides baunei Wunderlich, 1995 – Sardinia
- Spermophorides caesaris (Wunderlich, 1987) – Canary Is.
- Spermophorides cuneata (Wunderlich, 1987) – Canary Is.
- Spermophorides elevata (Simon, 1873) – Western Mediterranean
- Spermophorides esperanza (Wunderlich, 1987) – Canary Is.
- Spermophorides flava Wunderlich, 1992 – Canary Is.
- Spermophorides fuertecavensis Wunderlich, 1992 – Canary Is.
- Spermophorides fuerteventurensis (Wunderlich, 1987) – Canary Is.
- Spermophorides gibbifera (Wunderlich, 1987) – Canary Is.
- Spermophorides gomerensis (Wunderlich, 1987) – Canary Is.
- Spermophorides hermiguensis (Wunderlich, 1987) – Canary Is.
- Spermophorides heterogibbifera (Wunderlich, 1987) (type) – Canary Is.
- Spermophorides hierroensis Wunderlich, 1992 – Canary Is.
- Spermophorides huberti (Senglet, 1973) – Spain, France
- Spermophorides icodensis Wunderlich, 1992 – Canary Is.
- Spermophorides lanzarotensis Wunderlich, 1992 – Canary Is.
- Spermophorides lascars Saaristo, 2001 – Seychelles
- Spermophorides mamma (Wunderlich, 1987) – Canary Is.
- Spermophorides mammata (Senglet, 1973) – Spain
- Spermophorides mediterranea (Senglet, 1973) – Spain, France
- Spermophorides mercedes (Wunderlich, 1987) – Canary Is.
- Spermophorides petraea (Senglet, 1973) – Spain
- Spermophorides pseudomamma (Wunderlich, 1987) – Canary Is.
- Spermophorides ramblae Wunderlich, 1992 – Canary Is.
- Spermophorides reventoni Wunderlich, 1992 – Canary Is.
- Spermophorides sciakyi (Pesarini, 1984) – Canary Is.
- Spermophorides selvagensis Wunderlich, 1992 – Selvagens Is.
- Spermophorides simoni (Senglet, 1973) – France (Corsica)
- Spermophorides tenerifensis (Wunderlich, 1987) – Canary Is.
- Spermophorides tenoensis Wunderlich, 1992 – Canary Is.
- Spermophorides tilos (Wunderlich, 1987) – Canary Is.
- Spermophorides valentiana (Senglet, 1973) – Spain

== See also ==
- List of Pholcidae species
