= Capsulia =

Scientific classification
- Kingdom: Animalia
- Phylum: Arthropoda
- Subphylum: Chelicerata
- Class: Arachnida
- Order: Araneae
- Infraorder: Araneomorphae
- Family: Linyphiidae
- Genus: Capsulia; Saaristo, Tu & Li, 2006

Type species
- C. tianmushana (Chen & Song, 1987)

Species
- C. laciniosa Zhao & Li, 2014 – China; C. tianmushana (Chen & Song, 1987) – China

Genus of spiders

Capsulia is a genus of East Asian dwarf spiders that was first described by Michael I. Saaristo, L. H. Tu & S. Q. Li in 2006. As of May 2019 it contains only two species, both found in China: C. laciniosa and C. tianmushana.
