= Kalimagone =

Scientific classification
- Kingdom: Animalia
- Phylum: Arthropoda
- Subphylum: Chelicerata
- Class: Arachnida
- Order: Araneae
- Infraorder: Araneomorphae
- Family: Linyphiidae
- Genus: Kalimagone; Tanasevitch, 2017

Type species
- K. cuspidata Tanasevitch, 2017

Species
- K. cuspidata Tanasevitch, 2017 — Malaysia (Borneo); K. rotunda Tanasevitch, 2017 — Malaysia (Borneo)

Genus of spiders

Kalimagone is a genus of Malaysian dwarf spiders first described by A. V. Tanasevitch in 2017. As of April 2019 it contains only two species from Borneo.
