= Canariellanum =

Scientific classification
- Kingdom: Animalia
- Phylum: Arthropoda
- Subphylum: Chelicerata
- Class: Arachnida
- Order: Araneae
- Infraorder: Araneomorphae
- Family: Linyphiidae
- Genus: Canariellanum; Wunderlich, 1987

Type species
- C. arborense Wunderlich, 1987

Species
- 4, see text

Genus of spiders

Canariellanum is a genus of European dwarf spiders that was first described by J. Wunderlich in 1987.

== Species ==
As of May 2019 it contains four species, all found in Canary Islands:

- Canariellanum albidum Wunderlich, 1987 – Canary Is.
- Canariellanum arborense Wunderlich, 1987 (type) – Canary Is.
- Canariellanum hierroense Wunderlich, 1992 – Canary Is.
- Canariellanum palmense Wunderlich, 1987 – Canary Is.
