= Paragongylidiellum =

Scientific classification
- Kingdom: Animalia
- Phylum: Arthropoda
- Subphylum: Chelicerata
- Class: Arachnida
- Order: Araneae
- Infraorder: Araneomorphae
- Family: Linyphiidae
- Genus: Paragongylidiellum; Wunderlich, 1973
- Species: P. caliginosum

Binomial name
- Paragongylidiellum caliginosum Wunderlich, 1973

Genus of spiders

Paragongylidiellum is a monotypic genus of Asian dwarf spiders containing the single species, Paragongylidiellum caliginosum. It was first described by J. Wunderlich in 1973, and has only been found in India and Nepal.
