= Gamasomorpha gershomi =

Scientific classification
- Kingdom: Animalia
- Phylum: Arthropoda
- Subphylum: Chelicerata
- Class: Arachnida
- Order: Araneae
- Infraorder: Araneomorphae
- Family: Oonopidae
- Genus: Gamasomorpha
- Species: G. gershomi

Binomial name
- Gamasomorpha gershomi Saaristo, 2007

Species of spider

Gamasomorpha gershomi is a species of spider in the family Oonopidae, the goblin spiders. It is endemic to Israel.

== Taxonomy and etymology ==
Gamasomorpha gershomi was formally described by Finnish arachnologist Michael Saaristo in 2007. The specific name gershomi commemorates Gershom Levy, who studied the spiders of Israel.

== Description ==
Males are 1.54 mm long and females are 1.64 mm long.

It has an orange-brown body with a light-brown sternum (underside of the cephalothorax) and limbs. The eyes are placed such that they form an H. The eyes closer to the center are relatively large, with the others being around the same size as each other. The pedipalps are faint yellow except for the cymbium and palpal bulb of the males, which are white. In females, the end of the pedipalps bulge slightly. The top abdominal plate is oval-shaped and is longer and thinner in females. The bottom abdominal plate is nearly as long as the one on top, but has a shortened far end.

The operculae (plates that cover the book lungs) are darkly colored, big, and fairly resemble a kidney in shape. Males have a minute, cone-shaped bulge near the gonopore, which points toward the back.

== Distribution ==
Gamasomorpha gershomi has only been found south of Yahel, Israel.
