= Mesasigone =

Scientific classification
- Kingdom: Animalia
- Phylum: Arthropoda
- Subphylum: Chelicerata
- Class: Arachnida
- Order: Araneae
- Infraorder: Araneomorphae
- Family: Linyphiidae
- Genus: Mesasigone; Tanasevitch, 1989
- Species: M. mira

Binomial name
- Mesasigone mira Tanasevitch, 1989

Genus of spiders

Mesasigone is a monotypic genus of Asian dwarf spiders containing the single species, Mesasigone mira. It was first described by A. V. Tanasevitch in 1989, and has only been found in China, Iran, Kazakhstan, and Russia.
