= Nesioneta =

Scientific classification
- Kingdom: Animalia
- Phylum: Arthropoda
- Subphylum: Chelicerata
- Class: Arachnida
- Order: Araneae
- Infraorder: Araneomorphae
- Family: Linyphiidae
- Genus: Nesioneta; Millidge, 1991

Type species
- N. lepida Millidge, 1991

Species
- 9, see text

Genus of spiders

Nesioneta is a genus of dwarf spiders that was first described by J. A. Beatty, J. W. Berry & Alfred Frank Millidge in 1991.

== Species ==
As of May 2019 it contains nine species:

- Nesioneta arabica Tanasevitch, 2010 – United Arab Emirates
- Nesioneta benoiti (van Helsdingen, 1978) – Sri Lanka, Seychelles
- Nesioneta elegans Millidge, 1991 – Caroline Is., Fiji
- Nesioneta ellipsoidalis Tu & Li, 2006 – Vietnam
- Nesioneta lepida Millidge, 1991 (type) – Marshall Is., Caroline Is., Hawaii
- Nesioneta muriensis (Wunderlich, 1983) – Nepal
- Nesioneta pacificana (Berland, 1935) – Pacific Is.
- Nesioneta similis Millidge, 1991 – Caroline Is.
- Nesioneta sola (Millidge & Russell-Smith, 1992) – Indonesia (Sulawesi)
