= Monocerellus =

Scientific classification
- Kingdom: Animalia
- Phylum: Arthropoda
- Subphylum: Chelicerata
- Class: Arachnida
- Order: Araneae
- Infraorder: Araneomorphae
- Family: Linyphiidae
- Genus: Monocerellus; Tanasevitch, 1983
- Species: M. montanus

Binomial name
- Monocerellus montanus Tanasevitch, 1983

Genus of spiders

Monocerellus is a monotypic genus of Asian dwarf spiders containing the single species, Monocerellus montanus. It was first described by A. V. Tanasevitch in 1983, and has only been found in Russia.
