= Theoa elegans =

Scientific classification
- Kingdom: Animalia
- Phylum: Arthropoda
- Subphylum: Chelicerata
- Class: Arachnida
- Order: Araneae
- Infraorder: Araneomorphae
- Family: Linyphiidae
- Genus: Theoa
- Species: T. elegans

Binomial name
- Theoa elegans Tanasevitch, 2014

Species of spider

Theoa elegans is a species of spiders in the family Linyphiidae. It is found in China and Thailand.
