= Aperturina =

Scientific classification
- Kingdom: Animalia
- Phylum: Arthropoda
- Subphylum: Chelicerata
- Class: Arachnida
- Order: Araneae
- Infraorder: Araneomorphae
- Family: Linyphiidae
- Genus: Aperturina; Tanasevitch, 2014
- Species: A. paniculus

Binomial name
- Aperturina paniculus Tanasevitch, 2014

Genus of spiders

Aperturina is a monotypic genus of spiders belonging to the family Linyphiidae. It was first described by Tanasevitch in 2014. As of 2023, it contains only one species, Aperturina paniculus, found in Thailand and Malaysia.
