= Thaleria =

Scientific classification
- Kingdom: Animalia
- Phylum: Arthropoda
- Subphylum: Chelicerata
- Class: Arachnida
- Order: Araneae
- Infraorder: Araneomorphae
- Family: Linyphiidae
- Genus: Thaleria; Tanasevitch, 1984

Type species
- T. orientalis Tanasevitch, 1984

Species
- 6, see text

Genus of spiders

Thaleria is a genus of sheet weavers that was first described by A. V. Tanasevitch in 1984.

== Species ==
As of May 2019 it contains six species, found in Russia, the United States, and Alaska:

- Thaleria alnetorum Eskov & Marusik, 1992 – Russia
- Thaleria evenkiensis Eskov & Marusik, 1992 – Russia
- Thaleria leechi Eskov & Marusik, 1992 – Russia, USA (Alaska)
- Thaleria orientalis Tanasevitch, 1984 (type) – Russia
- Thaleria sajanensis Eskov & Marusik, 1992 – Russia
- Thaleria sukatchevae Eskov & Marusik, 1992 – Russia
