= Epibellowia =

Scientific classification
- Kingdom: Animalia
- Phylum: Arthropoda
- Subphylum: Chelicerata
- Class: Arachnida
- Order: Araneae
- Infraorder: Araneomorphae
- Family: Linyphiidae
- Genus: Epibellowia; Tanasevitch, 1996

Type species
- E. septentrionalis (Oi, 1960)

Species
- E. enormita (Tanasevitch, 1988) – Russia (Far East); E. pacifica (Eskov & Marusik, 1992) – Russia (South Siberia to Far East); E. septentrionalis (Oi, 1960) – Russia (Far East), Japan

Genus of spiders

Epibellowia is a genus of Asian dwarf spiders that was first described by A. V. Tanasevitch in 1996. As of May 2019 it contains only three species: E. enormita, E. pacifica, and E. septentrionalis.
