= Herbiphantes =

Scientific classification
- Kingdom: Animalia
- Phylum: Arthropoda
- Subphylum: Chelicerata
- Class: Arachnida
- Order: Araneae
- Infraorder: Araneomorphae
- Family: Linyphiidae
- Genus: Herbiphantes; Tanasevitch, 1992

Type species
- H. longiventris Tanasevitch, 1992

Species
- H. acutalis Irfan & Peng, 2019 – China; H. cericeus (Saito, 1934) – Russia (Kurile Is.), Korea, Japan; H. longiventris Tanasevitch, 1992 – Russia (Far East), Japan; H. pratensis Tanasevitch, 1992 – Russia (Sakhalin)

Genus of spiders

Herbiphantes is a genus of Asian dwarf spiders that was first described by A. V. Tanasevitch in 1992. As of May 2021 it contains four species, found in China, Japan, Korea and Russia: H. acutalis, H. cericeus, H. longiventris and H. pratensis.
