= Theoa =

Scientific classification
- Kingdom: Animalia
- Phylum: Arthropoda
- Subphylum: Chelicerata
- Class: Arachnida
- Order: Araneae
- Infraorder: Araneomorphae
- Family: Linyphiidae
- Genus: Theoa; Saaristo, 1995

Type species
- T. tricaudata (Locket, 1982)

Species
- 6, see text

Genus of spiders

Theoa is a genus of sheet weavers that was first described by Michael I. Saaristo in 1995.

== Species ==
As of May 2019 it contains six species, found in Asia and on the Seychelles:

- Theoa elegans Tanasevitch, 2014 – China, Thailand
- Theoa hamata Tanasevitch, 2014 – Thailand, Laos, Indonesia (Sumatra)
- Theoa longicrusa Tanasevitch, 2014 – Thailand
- Theoa malaya Tanasevitch, 2017 – Malaysia (mainland)
- Theoa tricaudata (Locket, 1982) (type) – Seychelles, Thailand, Malaysia (mainland)
- Theoa vesica Zhao & Li, 2014 – China
