= Mitrager =

Scientific classification
- Kingdom: Animalia
- Phylum: Arthropoda
- Subphylum: Chelicerata
- Class: Arachnida
- Order: Araneae
- Infraorder: Araneomorphae
- Family: Linyphiidae
- Genus: Mitrager van Helsdingen, 1985

Type species
- M. noordami van Helsdingen, 1985

Species
- 25, see text

Genus of spiders

Mitrager is a genus of Asian dwarf spiders that was first described by P. J. van Helsdingen in 1985.

== Species ==
As of June 2022 it contains twenty-five species:

- Mitrager angelus (Tanasevitch, 1998) – Nepal
- Mitrager assueta (Tanasevitch, 1998) – Nepal
- Mitrager clypeellum (Tanasevitch, 1998) – Nepal
- Mitrager cornuta (Tanasevitch, 2015) – India
- Mitrager coronata (Tanasevitch, 1998) – Nepal
- Mitrager dismodicoides (Wunderlich, 1974) – Nepal
- Mitrager elongatus (Wunderlich, 1974) – Nepal
- Mitrager falcifera (Tanasevitch, 1998) – Nepal
- Mitrager falciferoides (Tanasevitch, 2015) – India
- Mitrager globiceps (Thaler, 1987) – India (Kashmir)
- Mitrager hirsuta (Wunderlich, 1974) – Nepal
- Mitrager lineata (Wunderlich, 1974) – Nepal
- Mitrager lopchu (Tanasevitch, 2015) – India
- Mitrager lucida (Wunderlich, 1974) – Nepal
- Mitrager malearmata (Tanasevitch, 1998) – Nepal
- Mitrager modesta (Tanasevitch, 1998) – Nepal
- Mitrager noordami van Helsdingen, 1985 (type) – Indonesia (Java)
- Mitrager rustica (Tanasevitch, 2015) – India
- Mitrager savigniformis (Tanasevitch, 1998) – Nepal
- Mitrager sexoculata (Wunderlich, 1974) – Nepal
- Mitrager sexoculorum (Tanasevitch, 1998) – Nepal
- Mitrager tholusa (Tanasevitch, 1998) – Nepal
- Mitrager triceps (Tanasevitch, 2020) – Nepal
- Mitrager unicolor (Wunderlich, 1974) – Nepal
- Mitrager villosus (Tanasevitch, 2015) – India
