= Claviphantes =

Scientific classification
- Kingdom: Animalia
- Phylum: Arthropoda
- Subphylum: Chelicerata
- Class: Arachnida
- Order: Araneae
- Infraorder: Araneomorphae
- Family: Linyphiidae
- Genus: Claviphantes; Tanasevitch & Saaristo, 2006

Type species
- C. bifurcatus (Tanasevitch, 1987)

Species
- C. bifurcatoides (Tanasevitch, 1987) – Nepal; C. bifurcatus (Tanasevitch, 1987) – Nepal

Genus of spiders

Claviphantes is a genus of Asian dwarf spiders that was first described by A. V. Tanasevitch & Michael I. Saaristo in 2006. As of May 2019 it contains only two species, both found in Nepal: C. bifurcatoides and C. bifurcatus.
