= Eskovia =

Scientific classification
- Kingdom: Animalia
- Phylum: Arthropoda
- Subphylum: Chelicerata
- Class: Arachnida
- Order: Araneae
- Infraorder: Araneomorphae
- Family: Linyphiidae
- Genus: Eskovia; Marusik & Saaristo, 1999

Type species
- E. exarmata (Eskov, 1989)

Species
- E. exarmata (Eskov, 1989) – Russia (Middle Siberia to Far East), Canada; E. mongolica Marusik & Saaristo, 1999 – Mongolia

Genus of spiders

Eskovia is a genus of dwarf spiders that was first described by Y. M. Marusik & Michael I. Saaristo in 1999. As of May 2019 it contains only two species: E. exarmata and E. mongolica.

The male carapace in both members of this genus has a distinct shape, appearing roughly trapezoidal in profile, especially in E. exarmata.
