= Eldonnia =

Scientific classification
- Kingdom: Animalia
- Phylum: Arthropoda
- Subphylum: Chelicerata
- Class: Arachnida
- Order: Araneae
- Infraorder: Araneomorphae
- Family: Linyphiidae
- Genus: Eldonnia; Tanasevitch, 2008
- Species: E. kayaensis

Binomial name
- Eldonnia kayaensis (Paik, 1965)

Genus of spiders

Eldonnia is a monotypic genus of Asian dwarf spiders containing the single species, Eldonnia kayaensis. It was first described by A. V. Tanasevitch in 2008, and has only been found in Japan, Korea, and Russia.
