= Javanyphia =

Scientific classification
- Kingdom: Animalia
- Phylum: Arthropoda
- Subphylum: Chelicerata
- Class: Arachnida
- Order: Araneae
- Infraorder: Araneomorphae
- Family: Linyphiidae
- Genus: Javanyphia; Tanasevitch, 2020
- Species: J. gede

Binomial name
- Javanyphia gede Tanasevitch, 2020

Genus of spiders

Javanyphia is a monotypic genus of southeast Asian sheet weavers containing the single species, Javanyphia gede. It was first described by A. V. Tanasevitch in 2020 and it has only been found in Indonesia.

== See also ==
- Javagone
- Javanaria
