= Erigophantes =

Scientific classification
- Kingdom: Animalia
- Phylum: Arthropoda
- Subphylum: Chelicerata
- Class: Arachnida
- Order: Araneae
- Infraorder: Araneomorphae
- Family: Linyphiidae
- Genus: Erigophantes; Wunderlich, 1995
- Species: E. borneoensis

Binomial name
- Erigophantes borneoensis Wunderlich, 1995

Genus of spiders

Erigophantes is a monotypic genus of Indonesian dwarf spiders containing the single species, Erigophantes borneoensis. It was first described by J. Wunderlich in 1995, and has only been found on Borneo.
