= Bifurcia =

Scientific classification
- Kingdom: Animalia
- Phylum: Arthropoda
- Subphylum: Chelicerata
- Class: Arachnida
- Order: Araneae
- Infraorder: Araneomorphae
- Family: Linyphiidae
- Genus: Bifurcia; Saaristo, Tu & Li, 2006

Type species
- B. ramosa (Li & Zhu, 1987)

Species
- 9, see text

Genus of spiders

Bifurcia is a genus of Asian dwarf spiders that was first described by Michael I. Saaristo, L. H. Tu & S. Q. Li in 2006.

== Species ==
As of July 2021 it contains nine species, all from China and far eastern Russia:

- Bifurcia cucurbita Zhai & Zhu, 2007 – China
- Bifurcia curvata (Sha & Zhu, 1987) – China
- Bifurcia dersuuzalai Fomichev & Omelko, 2021 – Russia (Far East)
- Bifurcia maritima (Tanasevitch, 2010) – Russia (Far East)
- Bifurcia oligerae Marusik, Omelko & Koponen, 2016 – Russia (Far East)
- Bifurcia pseudosongi Quan & Chen, 2012 – China
- Bifurcia ramosa (Li & Zhu, 1987) (type) – China
- Bifurcia songi Zhai & Zhu, 2007 – China
- Bifurcia tanasevitchi Marusik, Omelko & Koponen, 2016 – Russia (Far East)
