= Nesioneta benoiti =

Scientific classification
- Kingdom: Animalia
- Phylum: Arthropoda
- Subphylum: Chelicerata
- Class: Arachnida
- Order: Araneae
- Infraorder: Araneomorphae
- Family: Linyphiidae
- Genus: Nesioneta
- Species: N. benoiti

Binomial name
- Nesioneta benoiti (van Helsdingen, 1978)

Species of spider

Nesioneta benoiti is a species of spider of the genus Nesioneta. It is endemic to Sri Lanka.
