= Palliduphantes bayrami =

Scientific classification
- Domain: Eukaryota
- Kingdom: Animalia
- Phylum: Arthropoda
- Subphylum: Chelicerata
- Class: Arachnida
- Order: Araneae
- Infraorder: Araneomorphae
- Family: Linyphiidae
- Genus: Palliduphantes
- Species: P. bayrami

Binomial name
- Palliduphantes bayrami Demir, Topçu & Seyyar, 2008

Species of spider

Palliduphantes bayrami is a species of sheet weaver spider found in the Karaman Province of Turkey. It was described by Demir, Topçu & Seyyar in 2008. It is named in honor of arachnologist Dr. Abdullah Bayram.

== Description ==
The body length of P. bayrami is 2–2.5 centimetres (0.79–0.98 in) with a yellow carapace, grey abdomen, and yellow to brownish legs. The leg span is 4.77–5.28 centimetres (1.88–2.08 in). It was discovered in Manaspoli Cave near humid clay where it spins its web among loose stones. This cave is the only known locality that this spider inhabits.
