= Crispiphantes =

Scientific classification
- Kingdom: Animalia
- Phylum: Arthropoda
- Subphylum: Chelicerata
- Class: Arachnida
- Order: Araneae
- Infraorder: Araneomorphae
- Family: Linyphiidae
- Genus: Crispiphantes; Tanasevitch, 1992

Type species
- C. rhomboideus (Paik, 1985)

Species
- C. biseulsanensis (Paik, 1985) – China, Korea; C. rhomboideus (Paik, 1985) – Russia (Far East), Korea

Genus of spiders

Crispiphantes is a genus of Asian dwarf spiders that was first described by A. V. Tanasevitch in 1992. As of May 2019 it contains only two species: C. biseulsanensis and C. rhomboideus.
