= Nesioneta elegans =

Scientific classification
- Domain: Eukaryota
- Kingdom: Animalia
- Phylum: Arthropoda
- Subphylum: Chelicerata
- Class: Arachnida
- Order: Araneae
- Infraorder: Araneomorphae
- Family: Linyphiidae
- Genus: Nesioneta
- Species: N. elegans

Binomial name
- Nesioneta elegans Millidge, 1991

Species of spider

Nesioneta elegans is a species of sheet weaver spiders (family Linyphiidae). It is found on the Caroline Islands and on Fiji.
