= Archaraeoncus =

Scientific classification
- Kingdom: Animalia
- Phylum: Arthropoda
- Subphylum: Chelicerata
- Class: Arachnida
- Order: Araneae
- Infraorder: Araneomorphae
- Family: Linyphiidae
- Genus: Archaraeoncus; Tanasevitch, 1987

Type species
- A. prospiciens (Thorell, 1875)

Species
- 4, see text

Genus of spiders

Archaraeoncus is a genus of dwarf spiders that was first described by A. V. Tanasevitch in 1987.

== Species ==
As of May 2019 it contains four species found in Europe and Asia:

- Archaraeoncus alticola Tanasevitch, 2008 – Iran
- Archaraeoncus hebraeus Tanasevitch, 2011 – Israel
- Archaraeoncus prospiciens (Thorell, 1875) (type) – Bulgaria, Ukraine, Russia (Urals), Azerbaijan, China
- Archaraeoncus sibiricus Eskov, 1988 – Russia (Middle Siberia to Far East)
