= Ceratinella brunnea =

Conservation status
- Secure (NatureServe)

Scientific classification
- Kingdom: Animalia
- Phylum: Arthropoda
- Subphylum: Chelicerata
- Class: Arachnida
- Order: Araneae
- Infraorder: Araneomorphae
- Family: Linyphiidae
- Genus: Ceratinella
- Species: C. brunnea

Binomial name
- Ceratinella brunnea Emerton, 1882

Species of spider

Ceratinella brunnea is a species of dwarf spider in the family Linyphiidae. It is found in the United States and Canada.
