= Ceratinella ornatula =

Scientific classification
- Kingdom: Animalia
- Phylum: Arthropoda
- Subphylum: Chelicerata
- Class: Arachnida
- Order: Araneae
- Infraorder: Araneomorphae
- Family: Linyphiidae
- Genus: Ceratinella
- Species: C. ornatula

Binomial name
- Ceratinella ornatula (Crosby & Bishop, 1925)

Synonyms
- Ceraticelus ornatulus Crosby & Bishop, 1925

Species of spider

Ceratinella ornatula is a spider species native to Canada, Greenland, and Alaska in the United States. It belongs to the Linyphiidae family. The species was first described by C. R. Crosby and S. C. Bishop in 1925 as Ceraticelus ornatulus.

== Subspecies ==
Two subspecies are recognized:

- Ceratinella ornatula alaskana Chamberlin, 1949
- Ceratinella ornatula ornatula

Ceratinella ornatula alaskana is endemic to Alaska in the United States, and was described for the first time by Chamberlin in 1949.
