= Gamasomorpha taprobanica =

Scientific classification
- Kingdom: Animalia
- Phylum: Arthropoda
- Subphylum: Chelicerata
- Class: Arachnida
- Order: Araneae
- Infraorder: Araneomorphae
- Family: Oonopidae
- Genus: Gamasomorpha
- Species: G. taprobanica

Binomial name
- Gamasomorpha taprobanica Simon, 1893

Species of spider

Gamasomorpha taprobanica, is a species of spider of the genus Gamasomorpha. It is endemic to Sri Lanka.
