= Allotiso =

Scientific classification
- Kingdom: Animalia
- Phylum: Arthropoda
- Subphylum: Chelicerata
- Class: Arachnida
- Order: Araneae
- Infraorder: Araneomorphae
- Family: Linyphiidae
- Genus: Allotiso; Tanasevitch, 1990
- Species: A. lancearius

Binomial name
- Allotiso lancearius (Tanasevitch, 1987)

Genus of spiders

Allotiso is a monotypic genus of dwarf spiders containing the single species, Allotiso lancearius. It was first described by A. V. Tanasevitch in 1990, and has only been found in Georgia and in Turkey.
