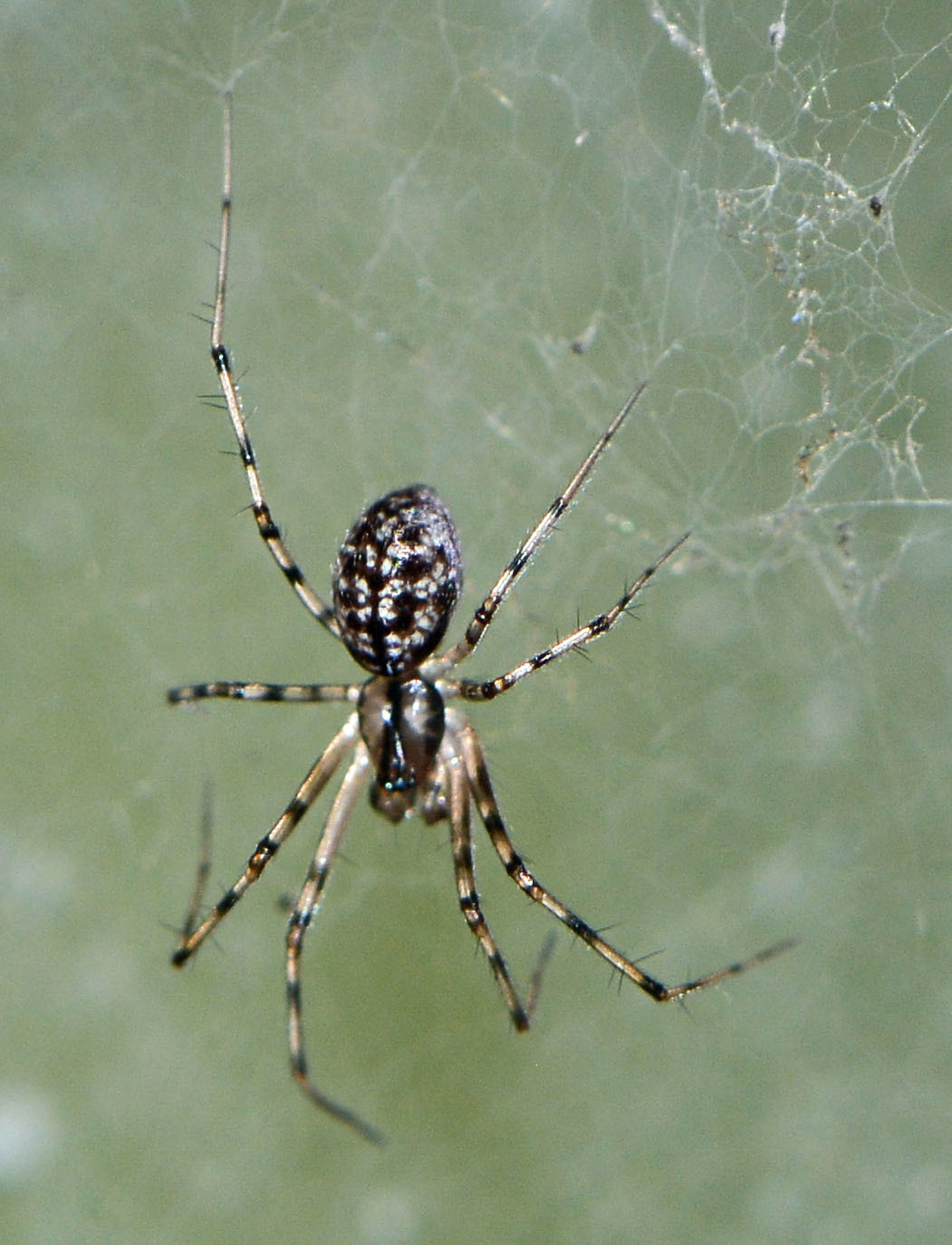

Scientific classification
- Domain: Eukaryota
- Kingdom: Animalia
- Phylum: Arthropoda
- Subphylum: Chelicerata
- Class: Arachnida
- Order: Araneae
- Infraorder: Araneomorphae
- Family: Linyphiidae
- Genus: Megalepthyphantes
- Species: M. nebulosus

Binomial name
- Megalepthyphantes nebulosus (Sundevall, 1830)

= Megalepthyphantes nebulosus =

Species of spider

Megalepthyphantes nebulosus is a species of sheetweb spider in the family Linyphiidae. It is found in North America, Europe, Turkey, Caucasus, and from European Russia to the Far East.
