= Saaristoa sammamish =

Scientific classification
- Domain: Eukaryota
- Kingdom: Animalia
- Phylum: Arthropoda
- Subphylum: Chelicerata
- Class: Arachnida
- Order: Araneae
- Infraorder: Araneomorphae
- Family: Linyphiidae
- Genus: Saaristoa
- Species: S. sammamish

Binomial name
- Saaristoa sammamish (L. R. Levi & H. W. Levi, 1955)

Synonyms
- Lepthyphantes sammamish Levi & Levi, 1955

Species of spider

Saaristoa sammamish is a species of sheetweb spider in the family Linyphiidae. It is found in the United States.
