= Idionella rugosa =

Scientific classification
- Domain: Eukaryota
- Kingdom: Animalia
- Phylum: Arthropoda
- Subphylum: Chelicerata
- Class: Arachnida
- Order: Araneae
- Infraorder: Araneomorphae
- Family: Linyphiidae
- Genus: Idionella
- Species: I. rugosa

Binomial name
- Idionella rugosa (Crosby, 1905)

Species of spider

Idionella rugosa is a species of dwarf spider in the family Linyphiidae. It is found in the United States.
