= Spermophorides valentiana =

Scientific classification
- Domain: Eukaryota
- Kingdom: Animalia
- Phylum: Arthropoda
- Subphylum: Chelicerata
- Class: Arachnida
- Order: Araneae
- Infraorder: Araneomorphae
- Family: Pholcidae
- Genus: Spermophorides
- Species: S. valentiana

Binomial name
- Spermophorides valentiana (Senglet, 1973)

Species of spider

Spermophorides valentiana is a cellar spider species found in Spain.

== See also ==
- List of Pholcidae species
