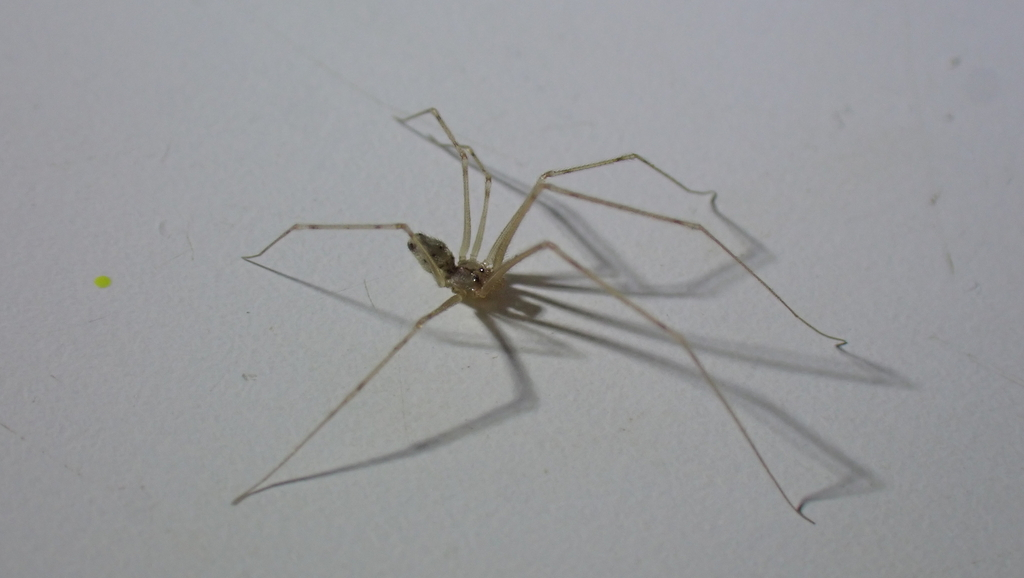

Scientific classification
- Kingdom: Animalia
- Phylum: Arthropoda
- Subphylum: Chelicerata
- Class: Arachnida
- Order: Araneae
- Infraorder: Araneomorphae
- Family: Pholcidae
- Genus: Spermophorides
- Species: S. huberti

Binomial name
- Spermophorides huberti (Senglet, 1973)

= Spermophorides huberti =

Species of spider

Spermophorides huberti is a cellar spider species found in Spain and France.

== See also ==
- List of Pholcidae species
