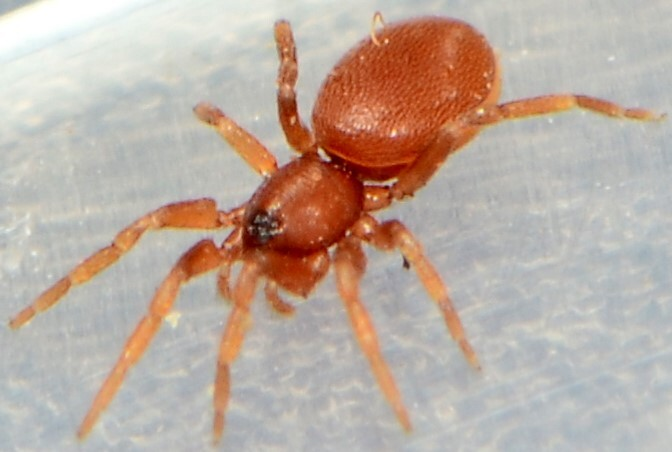
- female G. humicola
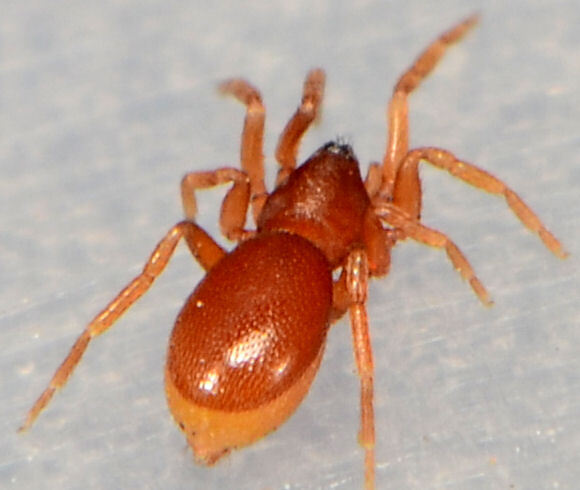
- female G. humicola

Scientific classification
- Kingdom: Animalia
- Phylum: Arthropoda
- Subphylum: Chelicerata
- Class: Arachnida
- Order: Araneae
- Infraorder: Araneomorphae
- Family: Oonopidae
- Genus: Gamasomorpha; Karsch, 1881

Type species
- Gamasomorpha cataphracta Karsch, 1881

Species
- See text

Diversity
- 48 species

= Gamasomorpha =

Genus of spiders

Gamasomorpha is a genus of goblin spiders in the family Oonopidae, containing sixty three accepted species.

Its members are found in Asia and Africa, with a few species found in Australia and South America.

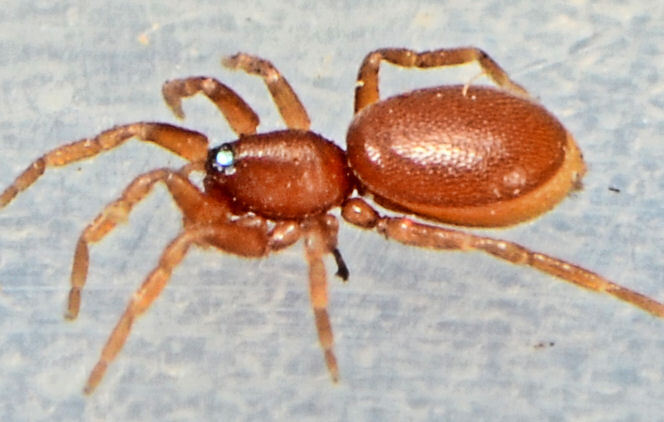
female G. humicola

== Species ==
As of October 2025, this genus includes 48 species:

- Gamasomorpha anhuiensis Song & Xu, 1984 – China
- Gamasomorpha arabica Simon, 1893 – Egypt
- Gamasomorpha asterobothros Eichenberger, 2012 – Indonesia (Sumatra)
- Gamasomorpha austera Simon, 1898 – Seychelles
- Gamasomorpha australis Hewitt, 1915 – South Africa
- Gamasomorpha barbifera Tong & Li, 2007 – China
- Gamasomorpha camelina Simon, 1893 – Singapore
- Gamasomorpha cataphracta Karsch, 1881 – Korea, Japan, Taiwan, Philippines (type species)
- Gamasomorpha clarki Hickman, 1950 – Australia
- Gamasomorpha clypeolaria Simon, 1907 – India
- Gamasomorpha comosa Tong & Li, 2009 – China (Hainan), Laos
- Gamasomorpha coniacris Eichenberger, 2012 – Malaysia (peninsula), Indonesia (Bintan Is.)
- Gamasomorpha deksam Saaristo & van Harten, 2002 – Yemen (Socotra)
- Gamasomorpha fricki Eichenberger, 2012 – Vietnam
- Gamasomorpha gershomi Saaristo, 2007 – Israel
- Gamasomorpha humicola Lawrence, 1947 – South Africa
- Gamasomorpha inclusa (Thorell, 1887) – Myanmar
- Gamasomorpha insomnia Eichenberger, 2012 – Thailand, Malaysia (peninsula, Borneo), Indonesia (Borneo, Sulawesi, New Guinea)
- Gamasomorpha jeanneli Fage, 1936 – Kenya
- Gamasomorpha kabulensis Roewer, 1960 – Afghanistan
- Gamasomorpha keri Eichenberger, 2012 – Indonesia (Sumatra)
- Gamasomorpha kraepelini Simon, 1905 – Indonesia (Java)
- Gamasomorpha kusumii Komatsu, 1963 – Japan
- Gamasomorpha lalana Suman, 1965 – Japan, Hawaii
- Gamasomorpha linzhiensis Hu, 2001 – China
- Gamasomorpha longisetosa Lawrence, 1952 – South Africa
- Gamasomorpha microps Simon, 1907 – Sri Lanka
- Gamasomorpha mornensis Benoit, 1979 – Seychelles
- Gamasomorpha nigrilineata Xu, 1986 – China
- Gamasomorpha nitida Simon, 1893 – Philippines
- Gamasomorpha ophiria Eichenberger, 2012 – Malaysia (peninsula)
- Gamasomorpha petoteca Eichenberger, 2012 – Indonesia (Sumatra)
- Gamasomorpha plana (Keyserling, 1883) – Peru
- Gamasomorpha porcina Simon, 1909 – Vietnam
- Gamasomorpha psyllodes Thorell, 1897 – Myanmar
- Gamasomorpha pusilla Berland, 1914 – Tanzania
- Gamasomorpha raya Eichenberger, 2012 – Malaysia (peninsula), Indonesia (Bintan Is.)
- Gamasomorpha schmilingi Eichenberger, 2012 – Malaysia (peninsula), Indonesia (Bali)
- Gamasomorpha sculptilis Thorell, 1897 – Myanmar
- Gamasomorpha semitecta Simon, 1907 – Indonesia (Sumatra)
- Gamasomorpha servula Simon, 1908 – Australia (Western Australia)
- Gamasomorpha seximpressa Simon, 1907 – Indonesia (Java)
- Gamasomorpha squalens Eichenberger, 2012 – Malaysia (peninsula)
- Gamasomorpha subclathrata Simon, 1907 – Sri Lanka
- Gamasomorpha taprobanica Simon, 1893 – Sri Lanka
- Gamasomorpha testudinella Berland, 1914 – Kenya
- Gamasomorpha tovarensis (Simon, 1893) – Venezuela
- Gamasomorpha virgulata Tong & Li, 2009 – China (Hainan)
