= Saaristattus =

Scientific classification
- Kingdom: Animalia
- Phylum: Arthropoda
- Subphylum: Chelicerata
- Class: Arachnida
- Order: Araneae
- Infraorder: Araneomorphae
- Family: Salticidae
- Genus: Saaristattus; Logunov & Azarkina, 2008
- Species: S. tropicus

Binomial name
- Saaristattus tropicus Logunov & Azarkina, 2008

Genus of spiders

Saaristattus is a monotypic genus of Malaysian jumping spiders containing the single species, Saaristattus tropicus. It was first described by D. V. Logunov & G. N. Azarkina in 2008, and is found only in Malaysia. The name is a combination of Michael Saaristo and attus, a common suffix for salticid genera, meaning "jumper". The species name means "tropical".
