= Idionella =

Scientific classification
- Kingdom: Animalia
- Phylum: Arthropoda
- Subphylum: Chelicerata
- Class: Arachnida
- Order: Araneae
- Infraorder: Araneomorphae
- Family: Linyphiidae
- Genus: Idionella; Banks, 1893

Type species
- I. formosa (Banks, 1892)

Species
- 8, see text

Genus of spiders

Idionella is a genus of North American dwarf spiders that was first described by Nathan Banks in 1893.

== Species ==
As of May 2019 it contains eight species and one subspecies, found in Mexico and the United States:

- Idionella anomala (Gertsch & Ivie, 1936) – USA
- Idionella deserta (Gertsch & Ivie, 1936) – USA
- Idionella formosa (Banks, 1892) (type) – USA
  - Idionella f. pista (Chamberlin, 1949) – USA
- Idionella nesiotes (Crosby, 1924) – USA, Mexico
- Idionella rugosa (Crosby, 1905) – USA
- Idionella sclerata (Ivie & Barrows, 1935) – USA, Mexico
- Idionella titivillitium (Crosby & Bishop, 1925) – USA
- Idionella tugana (Chamberlin, 1949) – USA
