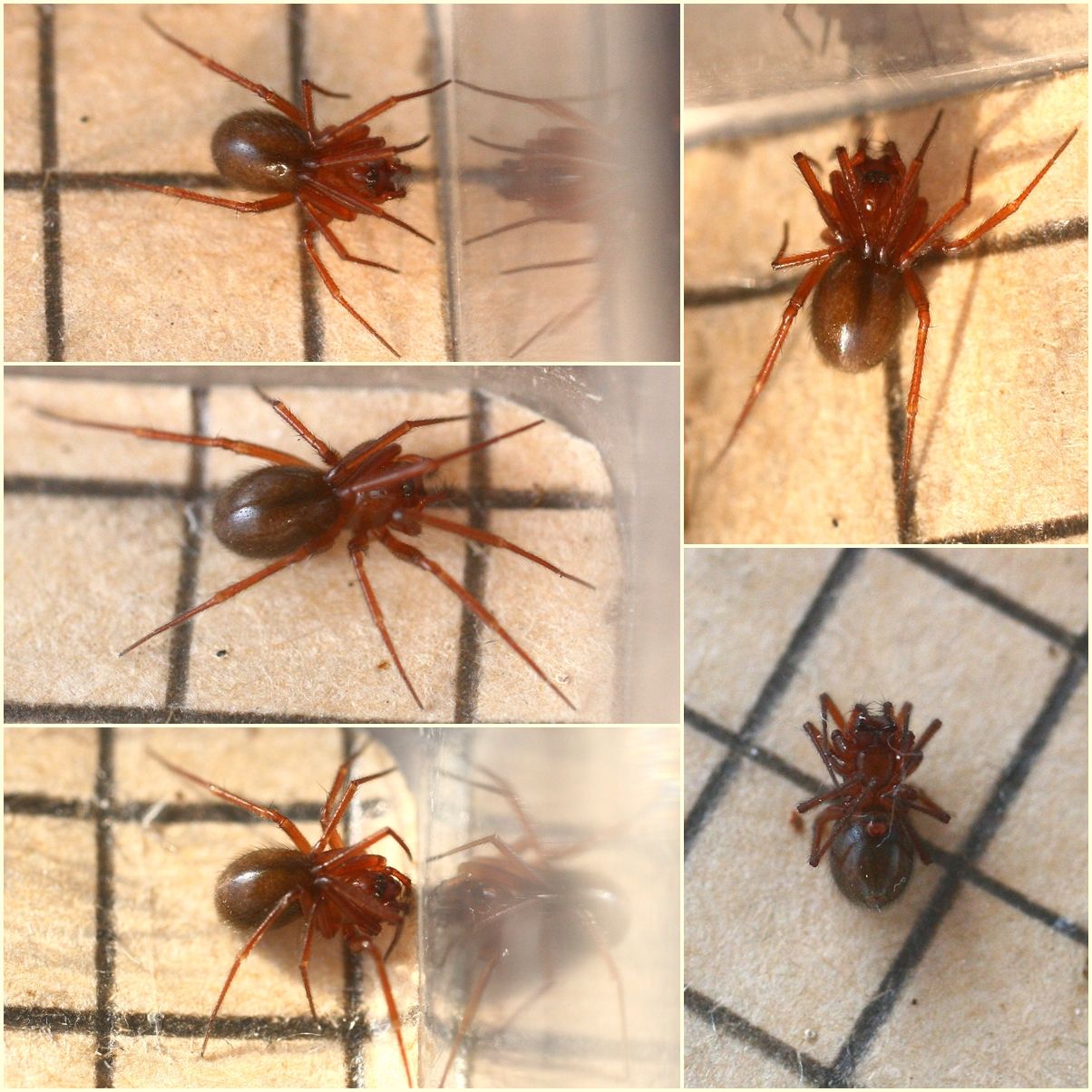
- S. abnormis

Scientific classification
- Kingdom: Animalia
- Phylum: Arthropoda
- Subphylum: Chelicerata
- Class: Arachnida
- Order: Araneae
- Infraorder: Araneomorphae
- Family: Linyphiidae
- Genus: Saaristoa; Millidge, 1978

Type species
- S. abnormis (Blackwall, 1841)

Species
- 5, see text

= Saaristoa =

Genus of spiders

Saaristoa is a genus of sheet weavers that was first described by Alfred Frank Millidge in 1978.

== Species ==
As of May 2019 it contains five species, found in Europe, the United States, and Japan:

- Saaristoa abnormis (Blackwall, 1841) (type) – Europe
- Saaristoa ebinoensis (Oi, 1979) – Japan
- Saaristoa firma (O. Pickard-Cambridge, 1906) – Europe
- Saaristoa nipponica (Saito, 1984) – Japan
- Saaristoa sammamish (L. R. Levi & H. W. Levi, 1955) – USA
