= Michael Saaristo =

- Born: 1938
- Died: 2008 (aged 69–70)
- Scientific career
- Fields: Arachnology
- Workplaces: Zoological Museum, University of Turku
- Author abbrev. (zoology): Saaristo

Michael I. Saaristo (1938 – 27 April 2008) was a Finnish arachnologist, with a particular interest in the spiders of the Seychelles. The World Spider Catalog lists 61 genus names or synonyms and 109 species names or synonyms of which he is the sole or co-author.

His account of the spiders of the Seychelles was published in 2010, after his death, with the assistance of Yuri M. Marusik.

The spider genera Saaristoa and Saaristattus were named after him. The World Spider Catalog lists 15 species with the specific name saaristoi, honouring him.
