= Jörg Wunderlich =

German arachnologist and palaeontologist

- Born: 19 December 1939 (age 86); Berlin, Germany
- Education: Free University of Berlin
- Scientific career
- Fields: Arachnology, palaeontology
- Academic advisors: Otto Kraus
- Website: http://www.joergwunderlich.de

Jörg Wunderlich (born 19 December 1939) is a German arachnologist and palaeontologist. He is best known for his study of spiders in amber, describing over 1000 species, 300 genera, 50 tribes/subfamilies and 18 families in over 180 publications. Unlike most other arachnologists Jörg has never held any academic position and has worked as a private individual with no financial support for travel or equipment.

== Personal life ==
Jörg Wunderlich grew up in the east of Berlin and moved to the western part of the city with his family in 1951. The limited possibilities of schooling in the post-war period and the change to a school system with very different curricula meant that Wunderlich did not finish school until he was 20 years old. He began studying mathematics at the Free University of Berlin to become a teacher, but soon switched to biology, geography, political science and philosophy. His state examination at the university was a study of dwarf spiders at the Peacock Island in Berlin, in which he identified over 300 species of spiders, two of them new to science (Glyphesis taoplesius, Moebelia berolinensis). In 1969, Wunderlich moved to Straubenhardt, completed his pedagogy training and became a teacher at the Neuenbürg high school for 25 years (part-time for the last 15 years).

At his new place of residence in Straubenhardt, Wunderlich became a member of Alliance 90/The Greens and was in the municipal council for 10 years.

== Arachnology ==
Wunderlich worked autodidactically in arachnology, he had no teacher or colleague who was familiar with spiders. Otto Kraus was the first to give him advice and put him in contact with experts on literature and arachnology. Wunderlich became in personal contact with experts such as Hermann Wiehle, Wolfgang Crome, Herbert Levi, and Konrad Thaler, among others. He began his career studying spiders particularly in Linyphiidae and Theridiidae and undertook collecting trips to various countries (Australia, China, Dominican Republic, Ecuador, Gambia, Indonesia, Jordan, Malaysia, Myanmar, Peru, Singapore, USA and almost all of Europe), however he became interested in the spiders of Macaronesia. By the time he was 75 years old his interests broadened, particularly to amber spiders.

== Selected publications ==
- Wunderlich, Jörg (1988). The fossil Spiders in Dominican amber (PDF). Beiträge zur Araneologie (Beitr. Araneol.). Vol. 2. Joerg Wunderlich. pp. 1–378.
- Wunderlich, Jörg (1992). The Spider Fauna of the Macaronesian Islands. Beiträge zur Araneologie (Beitr. Araneol.). Vol. 1. Joerg Wunderlich. pp. 1–619.
- Wunderlich, Jörg (1995). A collection of 62 papers. Beiträge zur Araneologie (Beitr. Araneol.). Vol. 4. Joerg Wunderlich. pp. 1–778.
- Wunderlich, Jörg (2004). Fossil Spiders in Amber and Copal. Beiträge zur Araneologie (Beitr. Araneol.). Vol. 3. Joerg Wunderlich. pp. 1–1908.
- Wunderlich, Jörg (2008). Fossil and extant Spiders (Araneae) (PDF). Beiträge zur Araneologie (Beitr. Araneol.). Vol. 5. Joerg Wunderlich. pp. 1–840.
- Wunderlich, Jörg (2011). Extant and fossil Spiders (Araneae) (PDF). Beiträge zur Araneologie (Beitr. Araneol.). Vol. 6. Joerg Wunderlich. pp. 1–640.
- Wunderlich, Jörg (2012). Fifteen Papers on Extant and Fossil Spiders (PDF). Beiträge zur Araneologie (Beitr. Araneol.). Vol. 7. Joerg Wunderlich. pp. 1–368.
- Wunderlich, Jörg (2012). The Spider Families of Europe (PDF). Beiträge zur Araneologie (Beitr. Araneol.). Vol. 8. Joerg Wunderlich. pp. 1–192.
- Wunderlich, Jörg (2015). MESOZOIC SPIDERS and other fossil Arachnids (PDF). Beiträge zur Araneologie (Beitr. Araneol.). Vol. 9. Joerg Wunderlich. pp. 1–512.
- Wunderlich, Jörg (2017). Ten Papers on fossil and extant Spiders (Araneae) (PDF). Beiträge zur Araneologie (Beitr. Araneol.). Vol. 10. Joerg Wunderlich. pp. 1–332.
- Wunderlich, Jörg (2018). Fossil Spiders (Araneae) in Cretaceous Burmese Amber (PDF). Beiträge zur Araneologie (Beitr. Araneol.). Vol. 11. Joerg Wunderlich. pp. 1–177.
- Wunderlich, Jörg (2019). What is a Spider? (Araneae) (PDF). Beiträge zur Araneologie (Beitr. Araneol.). Vol. 12. Joerg Wunderlich. pp. 1–31.
- Wunderlich, Jörg (2020). Five Papers on fossil and extant Spiders (PDF). Beiträge zur Araneologie (Beitr. Araneol.). Vol. 13. Joerg Wunderlich. pp. 1–176.
- Wunderlich, Jörg (2021). A Paper on Cretaceous Fossil Spiders from Myanmar and a Paper on Extant Spiders from Portugal (Arachnida: Araneae) (PDF). Beiträge zur Araneologie (Beitr. Araneol.). Vol. 14. Joerg Wunderlich. pp. 1–262.
- Wunderlich, Jörg (2022). Five papers on extant spiders (Araneida) as well as on fossil spiders and Ricinulei (PDF). Beiträge zur Araneologie (Beitr. Araneol.). Vol. 15. Joerg Wunderlich. pp. 1–210.
