= Andrei Tanasevitch =

Russian arachnologist

Andrei Viktorovich Tanasevitch
- Андрей Викторович Танасевич
- Born: 8 August 1956 (age 70); Moscow, Russian SFSR, Soviet Union
- Education: Moscow State Pedagogical University
- Known for: Systematics and zoogeography of spiders
- Scientific career
- Fields: Arachnology
- Workplaces: Centre for Forest Ecology and Production, Russian Academy of Sciences

Andrei Viktorovich Tanasevitch (Russian: Андрей Викторович Танасевич; born 8 August 1956) is a Russian arachnologist and a senior researcher at the Centre for Forest Ecology and Production of the Russian Academy of Sciences.

== Biography ==
Tanasevitch studied at the Faculty of Biology of Moscow State Pedagogical University, where he received his doctoral degree in 1992. His dissertation was entitled The Spider Genus Lepthyphantes Menge of the North Palaearctic.

He is a senior researcher at the Centre for Forest Ecology and Production of the Russian Academy of Sciences.

=== Field of study ===
Within arachnology, Tanasevitch's principal research interests include the systematics of spiders, particularly the family Linyphiidae. He has also studied the chorology and distribution of spiders, conducting extensive field research in the mountainous regions of Central Asia.

His research also concerns spider biodiversity, zoogeography, and the environmental conservation of protected areas.

== Taxa described ==
- Abiskoa Saaristo & Tanasevitch, 2000, a spider in the family Linyphiidae
- Allotiso Tanasevitch, 1990, a spider in the family Linyphiidae
- Anguliphantes Saaristo & Tanasevitch, 1996, a spider in the family Linyphiidae
- Archaraeoncus Tanasevitch, 1996, a spider in the family Linyphiidae
- Claviphantes Saaristo & Tanasevitch, 1996, a spider in the family Linyphiidae
- Crispiphantes Tanasevitch, 1996, a spider in the family Linyphiidae

== Taxa named in his honor ==
- Tanasevitchia Marusik & Saaristo, 1999, a spider genus in the family Linyphiidae
- Chalcoscirtus tanasevitchi Marusik, 1991, a spider in the family Salticidae
- Diphya tanasevitchi (Zhang, Zhang & Yu, 2003), a spider in the family Tetragnathidae
- Plesiophantes tanasevitchi Wunderlich, 1990, a spider in the family Linyphiidae
- Succiphantes tanasevitchi Wunderlich, 2004, a spider in the family Linyphiidae
- Trachelas tanasevitchi Marusik & Kovblyuk, 2010, a spider in the family Corinnidae

== Publications ==
As of November 2011, 96 publications were listed under Tanasevitch's name.
