= Hermann Wiehle =

German teacher and arachnologist

- Born: Friedrich Martin Hermann Wiehle; 18 November 1884; Ballenstedt, Duchy of Anhalt, German Empire
- Died: 7 July 1966 (aged 81); Dessau, East Germany
- Education: Martin Luther University of Halle-Wittenberg
- Scientific career
- Fields: Arachnology

Hermann Wiehle (18 November 1884 in Ballenstedt – 7 July 1966 in Dessau), full name Friedrich Martin Hermann Wiehle, was a German teacher and arachnologist.

== Biography ==
After leaving school, Wiehle received his education from at the Anhaltisches Lehrerseminar in Köthen already the age of 15. After this he initially worked at a village school. Later he passed the middleschool teacher exam and then he worked as a teacher, mainly in the fields of biology and mathematics. From 1924 Wiehle was principal of the elementary school Flössergasse IV in Dessau.

1924, Wiehle got his Abitur at Domgymnasium Magdeburg. Then he extramurally studied at the Faculty of Biology of the Martin Luther University of Halle.

Already during the teacher training Wiehle developed a special interest in arachnids. During his studies he began to deal intensively with that issue. On 2 February 1927 Wiehle obtained his doctorate in Halle (Saale) with the thesis "Beiträge zur Kenntnis des Radnetzbaues der Epeiriden, Tetragnathiden und Uloboriden".

In 1933 Wiehle joined the National Socialist Teachers League and was Kreissachbearbeiter für Rassefragen. Later he became a member of the Nazi Party, after an initial refusal in 1938. In 1935, Wiehle became principal of a middleschool for boys in Dessau. He led the school until he was dismissed in 1945 because of his Nazi party membership.

From 1946 on, Wiehle was allowed to work again as a mathematics teacher at the vocational school of the rolling stock factory SAG Waggonbau Dessau. A little later he became responsible for workers' qualification, a post he held until his retirement.

As retiree, Wiehle devoted himself to arachnology again, was a corresponding member of the Senckenberg Gesellschaft für Naturforschung (Senckenberg Nature Research Society), whose "Silver Medal" he received on his 75th birthday and became a corresponding member of the German Academy of Sciences. The establishment of the International Society of Arachnology goes back to Wiehle, who gave the impetus in 1960 at an international meeting of arachnologists.

Wiehle died on 7 July 1966 in Dessau of the consequences of a heart attack that he suffered at a conference of arachnologists in June 1966 in Frankfurt.

== Works ==
Together with Maria Harm, teacher at Mädchenmittelschule II in Dessau, Wiehle wrote the textbook Lebenskunde für Mittelschulen, which was released in three parts. With Wilhelm Meil, principal of a middleschool in Dessau, he authored Einführung in die Rassenkunde unseres Volkes: Rasse verpflichtet!, published in 1935 in 12th edition.

- Beiträge zur Kenntnis des Radnetzbaues der Epeiriden, Tetragnathiden und Uloboriden. Thesis, Martin Luther University of Halle 1927
- Spinnentiere oder Arachnoidea (Araneae) - XI: Micryphantidae - Zwergspinnen. In: Friedrich Dahl, Hans Bischoff (editors): Die Tierwelt Deutschlands und der angrenzenden Meeresteile nach ihren Merkmalen und nach ihrer Lebensweise. 47. Teil, Gustav Fischer publishing house, Jena 1960
- Spinnentiere oder Arachnoidea (Araneae) - XII. Tetragnathidae - Streckspinnen und Dickkiefer. In: Friedrich Dahl, Maria Dahl, Fritz Peus (editors): Die Tierwelt Deutschlands und der angrenzenden Meeresteile nach ihren Merkmalen und nach ihrer Lebensweise. 49. Teil, Gustav Fischer publishing house, Jena 1963
- Vom Fanggewebe einheimischer Spinnen. Akademische Verlags Gesellschaft, Leipzig 1949
- Die einheimischen Tetragnatha-Arten (Araneae: Familie Argiopidae, Unterfamilie Tetragnathinae). German Academy of Sciences Leopoldina, Halle (Saale) 1939
- Aus dem Spinnenleben wärmerer Länder. Ziemsen, Lutherstadt Wittenberg 1954
