= Philaeus (disambiguation) =

Philaeus may refer to:

In Greek mythology:

- Philaeus (son of Ajax), a son of Ajax and Lysidice
- Philaeus, a son of Munichus and Lelante

In biology:

- Philaeus, a spider genus
  - Philaeus chrysops, a species in this genus
- Philaeus multicolor, a synonym for Paraphidippus aurantius
- Philaeus farneus, a synonym for Phidippus audax
