= Norman I. Platnick =

American arachnologist (1951–2020)

Norman Ira Platnick
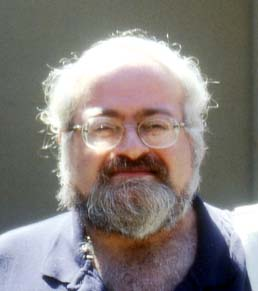
- Norman Platnick in 2001 at the 15th International Congress of Arachnology, Badplaas, South Africa
- Born: December 30, 1951; Bluefield, West Virginia, US
- Died: April 8, 2020 (aged 68); Philadelphia, Pennsylvania, US
- Education: Harvard University (Ph.D); Michigan State University (M.S.) Concord University (B.S.)
- Known for: Spider taxonomy
- Scientific career
- Fields: Arachnology
- Workplaces: American Museum of Natural History

Norman Ira Platnick (December 30, 1951 – April 8, 2020) was an American biological systematist and arachnologist. At the time of his death, he was a professor emeritus of the Richard Gilder Graduate School and Peter J. Solomon Family Curator Emeritus of the invertebrate zoology department of the American Museum of Natural History. A 1973 Ph.D. recipient at Harvard University, Platnick described over 1,800 species of spiders from around the world, making him the second most prolific spider taxonomist in history, behind only Eugène Simon. Until 2014 he was also the maintainer of the World Spider Catalog, a website formerly hosted by the AMNH which tracks the arachnology literature, and attempts to maintain a comprehensive list, sorted taxonomically, of every species of spider which has been formally described. In 2007 he received the International Society of Arachnology's Bonnet award, named for Pierre Bonnet, in recognition of his work on the catalog.

Platnick was recognized as a world leader in spider taxonomy. Dr. Quentin D. Wheeler stated "He is the best arachnologist of his generation, has published more monographs and nomenclatural contributions than anyone, period." Platnick was one of the founding members of the Willi Hennig Society and its fourth President (1991–1992). His contributions to theoretical cladistics, such as his 1981 book, Systematics and Biogeography: Cladistics and Vicariance (coauthored with Gareth Nelson), are also highly regarded.

Platnick's later undertaking involved the goblin spiders of Oonopidae as a part of the Planetary Biodiversity Inventory, a project which includes scientific institutions from across the world. There are currently almost 2,000 recorded species in 115 genera, but estimates have been placed as high as 2,500; the project aims to flesh out the recorded species list and gain a more exact picture of the family's Phylogeny through DNA analysis.

Platnick died April 8, 2020, of complications following a fall. He is commemorated in the names of 8 genera and over 50 species of invertebrates.

== Notable publications ==
- Platnick, N.I. (1973): A Revision of the North American Spiders of the Family Anyphaenidae. Ph.D. thesis, Harvard University.
- Gertsch, Willis J. & Platnick, N.I. (1979): A revision of the spider family Mecicobothriidae (Araneae, Mygalomorphae)." American Museum Novitates 2687 Abstract, PDF
- Nelson, G. J. & Platnick, N. I. (1981): Systematics and biogeography: cladistics and vicariance. Columbia University Press, New York. 567 pp.
- Platnick, N. I. (1990): Spinneret Morphology and the Phylogeny of Ground Spiders (Araneae, Gnaphosoidea). American Museum Novitates 2978: 1–42. PDF (33Mb)
- Platnick, N. I., Coddington, J.A., Forster, R.R., and Griswold, C.E. (1991): Spinneret Morphology and the Phylogeny of Haplogyne Spiders (Araneae, Araneomorphae). American Museum Novitates 3016: 1–73. PDF (50Mb)
- Platnick, N. I. (1998): Advances in Spider Taxonomy 1992–1995, with Redescriptions 1940–1980. New York Entomological Society 976 pp.
- Griswold, C. E., Coddington, J.A., Platnick, N.I. & Forster, R.R. (1999): Towards a Phylogeny of Entelegyne Spiders (Araneae, Araneomorphae, Entelegynae). Journal of Arachnology 27: 53–63. PDF
- Dimensions Of Biodiversity: Targeting Megadiverse Groups from: Cracraft, J. & Grifo, F.T. (eds.) (1999). The Living Planet In Crisis – Biodiversity Science and Policy. Columbia University Press.
- Platnick, N.I. (2000): A Relimitation and Revision of the Australasian Ground Spider Family Lamponidae (Araneae: Gnaphosoidea). Bulletin of the American Museum of Natural History 245: 1–330. Web version – Abstract, PDF
- Platnick, N.I. (2020): Spiders of the World. A Natural History Edited by PlatnickPrinceton University Press
