= Paraphilaeus =

Scientific classification
- Kingdom: Animalia
- Phylum: Arthropoda
- Subphylum: Chelicerata
- Class: Arachnida
- Order: Araneae
- Infraorder: Araneomorphae
- Family: Salticidae
- Genus: Paraphilaeus
- Species: P. daemeli

Binomial name
- Paraphilaeus daemeli (Keyserling, 1883)

Synonyms
- Plexippus daemelii Trite daemelii

Genus of spiders

Paraphilaeus is a genus of the jumping spiders found in Queensland and New South Wales. It contains only one species, Paraphilaeus daemeli. Though it has been known for a long time, in 2003, closer investigation showed that it represents a new genus and is neither related to Plexippus nor Trite. The genus name is derived from Ancient Greek para "alongside" and the salticid genus Philaeus.

They are 4–6 mm in length. The male palpal bulb has a very elongate cymbium, its outer half distinctly curved. The embolus is very long, passing across the ventral surface of the tegulum and along the edge of cymbium.
