= Erigonoplus =

Scientific classification
- Kingdom: Animalia
- Phylum: Arthropoda
- Subphylum: Chelicerata
- Class: Arachnida
- Order: Araneae
- Infraorder: Araneomorphae
- Family: Linyphiidae
- Genus: Erigonoplus; Simon, 1884

Type species
- E. inclarus (Simon, 1881)

Species
- 23, see text

Synonyms
- Cotyora Simon, 1926; Erigonopterna Miller, 1943

Genus of spiders

Erigonoplus is a genus of dwarf spiders that was first described by Eugène Louis Simon in 1884.

== Species ==
As of June 2022, it contains twenty-four species:

- Erigonoplus castellanus (O. Pickard-Cambridge, 1875) – Portugal, Spain
- Erigonoplus depressifrons (Simon, 1884) – Spain, France
- Erigonoplus dilatus (Denis, 1950) – Andorra
- Erigonoplus foveatus (Dahl, 1912) – Europe, Russia (Europe, Caucasus)
- Erigonoplus globipes (L. Koch, 1872) – Europe, Turkey, Armenia, Georgia
- Erigonoplus ibericus Bosmans & Déjean, 2022 – Portugal, Spain
- Erigonoplus inclarus (Simon, 1881) (type) – France (Corsica)
- Erigonoplus inspinosus Wunderlich, 1995 – Greece
- Erigonoplus jarmilae (Miller, 1943) – Austria, Czech Rep., Slovakia, Albania, Russia (Europe, Caucasus)
- Erigonoplus justus (O. Pickard-Cambridge, 1875) – Belgium, France, Germany
- Erigonoplus kirghizicus Tanasevitch, 1989 – Kazakhstan
- Erigonoplus latefissus (Denis, 1968) – Morocco
- Erigonoplus minaretifer Eskov, 1986 – Russia (Middle, north-eastern Siberia)
- Erigonoplus nasutus (O. Pickard-Cambridge, 1879) – Portugal, France
- Erigonoplus nigrocaeruleus (Simon, 1882) – France (Corsica), Italy (Sardinia, mainland)
- Erigonoplus ninae Tanasevitch & Fet, 1986 – Turkmenistan, Iran
- Erigonoplus nobilis Thaler, 1991 – Italy
- Erigonoplus sengleti Tanasevitch, 2008 – Iran
- Erigonoplus setosus Wunderlich, 1995 – Croatia, Greece
- Erigonoplus sibiricus Eskov & Marusik, 1997 – Russia (South Siberia)
- Erigonoplus simplex Millidge, 1979 – Italy, Albania, Bulgaria, Greece
- Erigonoplus spinifemuralis Dimitrov, 2003 – Greece (incl. Crete), Albania, North Macedonia, Bulgaria, Ukraine, Russia (Europe), Turkey
- Erigonoplus turriger (Simon, 1882) – France, Spain
- Erigonoplus zagros Tanasevitch, 2009 – Iran
