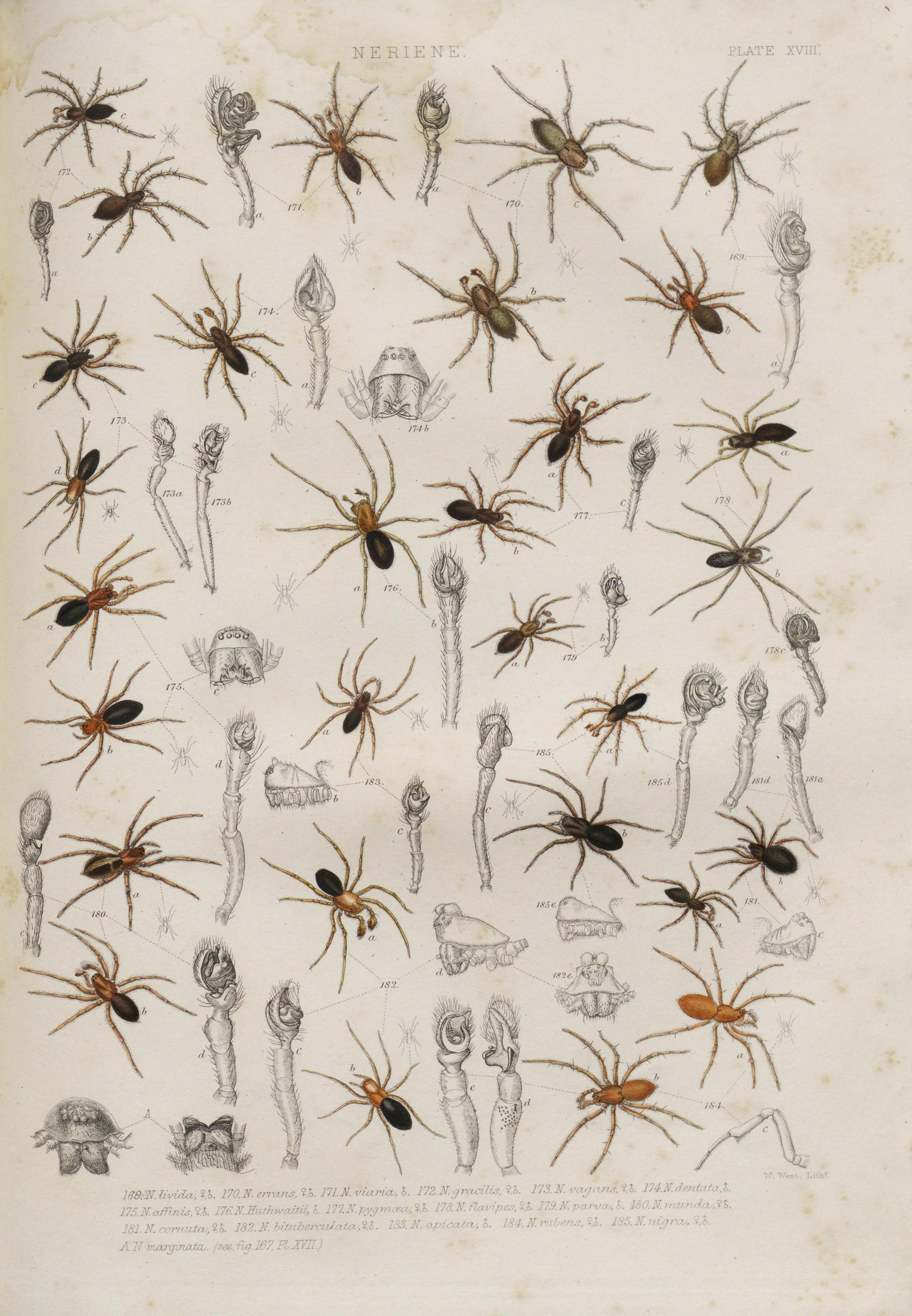
- Hypomma cornutum (Bl.) figure 18, Hypomma bituberculatum (Wider) figure 182

Scientific classification
- Kingdom: Animalia
- Phylum: Arthropoda
- Subphylum: Chelicerata
- Class: Arachnida
- Order: Araneae
- Infraorder: Araneomorphae
- Family: Linyphiidae
- Genus: Hypomma; Dahl, 1886

Type species
- H. bituberculatum (Wider, 1834)

Species
- 10, see text

Synonyms
- Enidia Smith, 1908

= Hypomma =

Genus of spiders

Hypomma is a genus of dwarf spiders that was first described by David B. Hirst in 1886.

== Species ==
As of May 2019 it contains ten species, found in China, Equatorial Guinea, Japan, Kazakhstan, Macedonia, Russia, Turkey, and the United States:

- Hypomma affine Schenkel, 1930 – Russia (north-eastern Siberia, Far East), Japan
- Hypomma bituberculatum (Wider, 1834) (type) – Europe, Turkey, Russia (Europe to Far East), Kazakhstan, Kyrgyzstan, China
- Hypomma brevitibiale (Wunderlich, 1980) – Macedonia
- Hypomma clypeatum Roewer, 1942 – Equatorial Guinea (Bioko)
- Hypomma coalescera (Kritscher, 1966) – New Caledonia
- Hypomma cornutum (Blackwall, 1833) – Europe, Russia (Europe to South Siberia)
- Hypomma fulvum (Bösenberg, 1902) – Europe
- Hypomma marxi (Keyserling, 1886) – USA
- Hypomma nordlandicum Chamberlin & Ivie, 1947 – USA (Alaska)
- Hypomma subarcticum Chamberlin & Ivie, 1947 – USA (Alaska)
