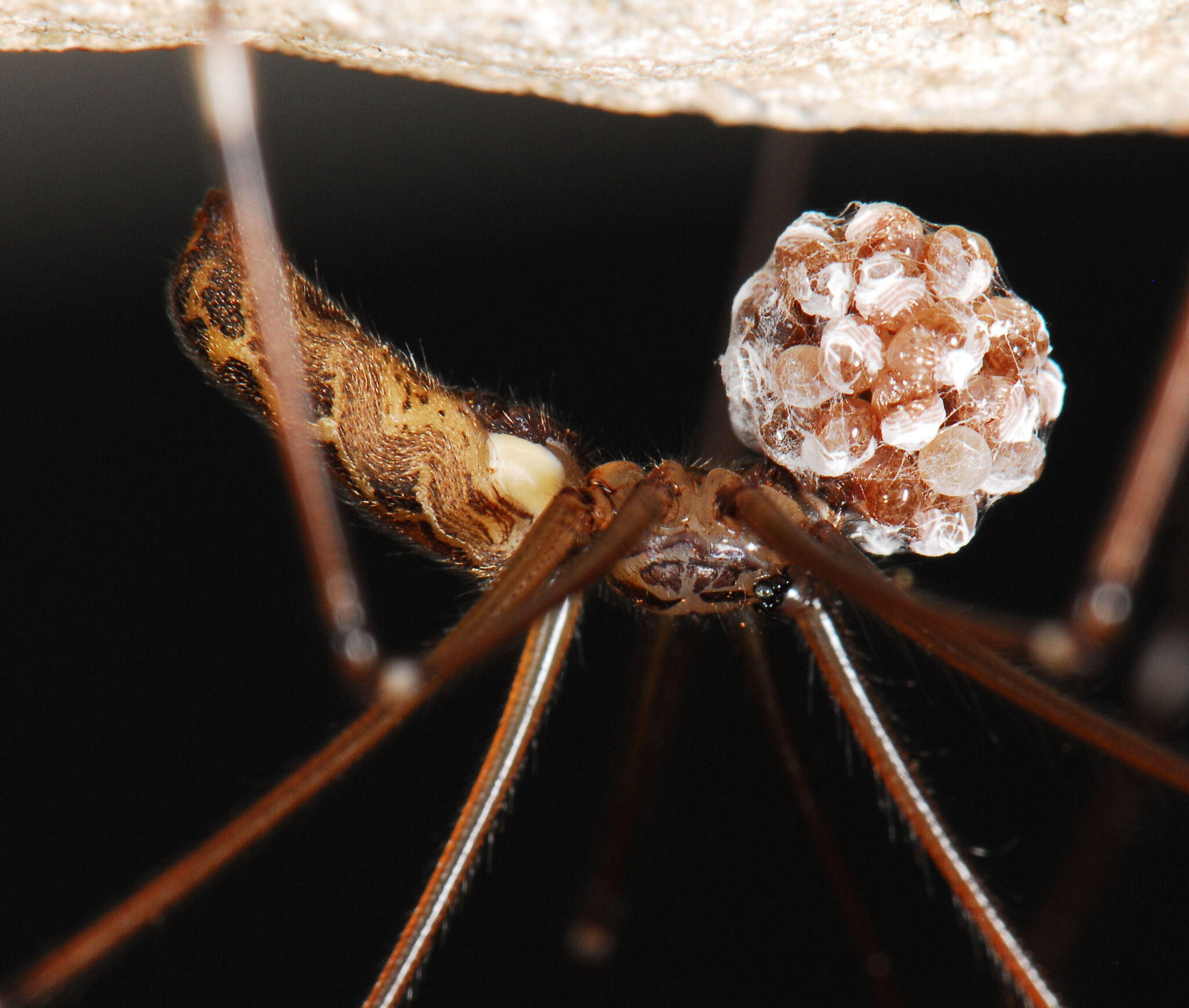
- female S. natalensis with egg sac
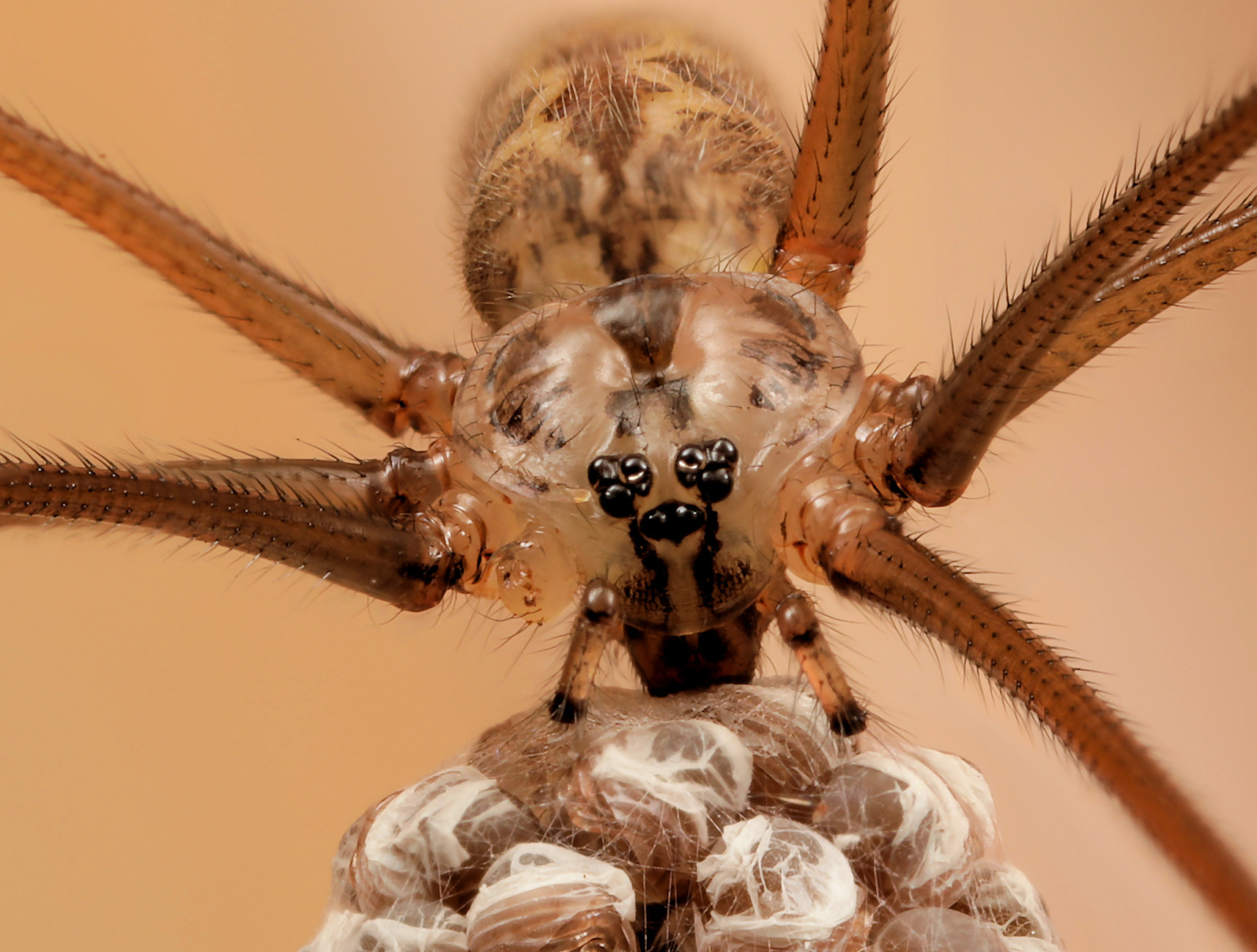
- female S. blyde

Scientific classification
- Kingdom: Animalia
- Phylum: Arthropoda
- Subphylum: Chelicerata
- Class: Arachnida
- Order: Araneae
- Infraorder: Araneomorphae
- Family: Pholcidae
- Subfamily: Holocneminae
- Genus: Smeringopus; Simon, 1890

Type species
- S. pallidus (Blackwall, 1858)

Species
- 55, see text

= Smeringopus =

Genus of spiders

Smeringopus is a genus of cellar spiders that was first described by Eugène Louis Simon in 1890.

Species of the genus are found in Africa, South America, Asia, Australia, and on the Pacific Islands.

== Species ==
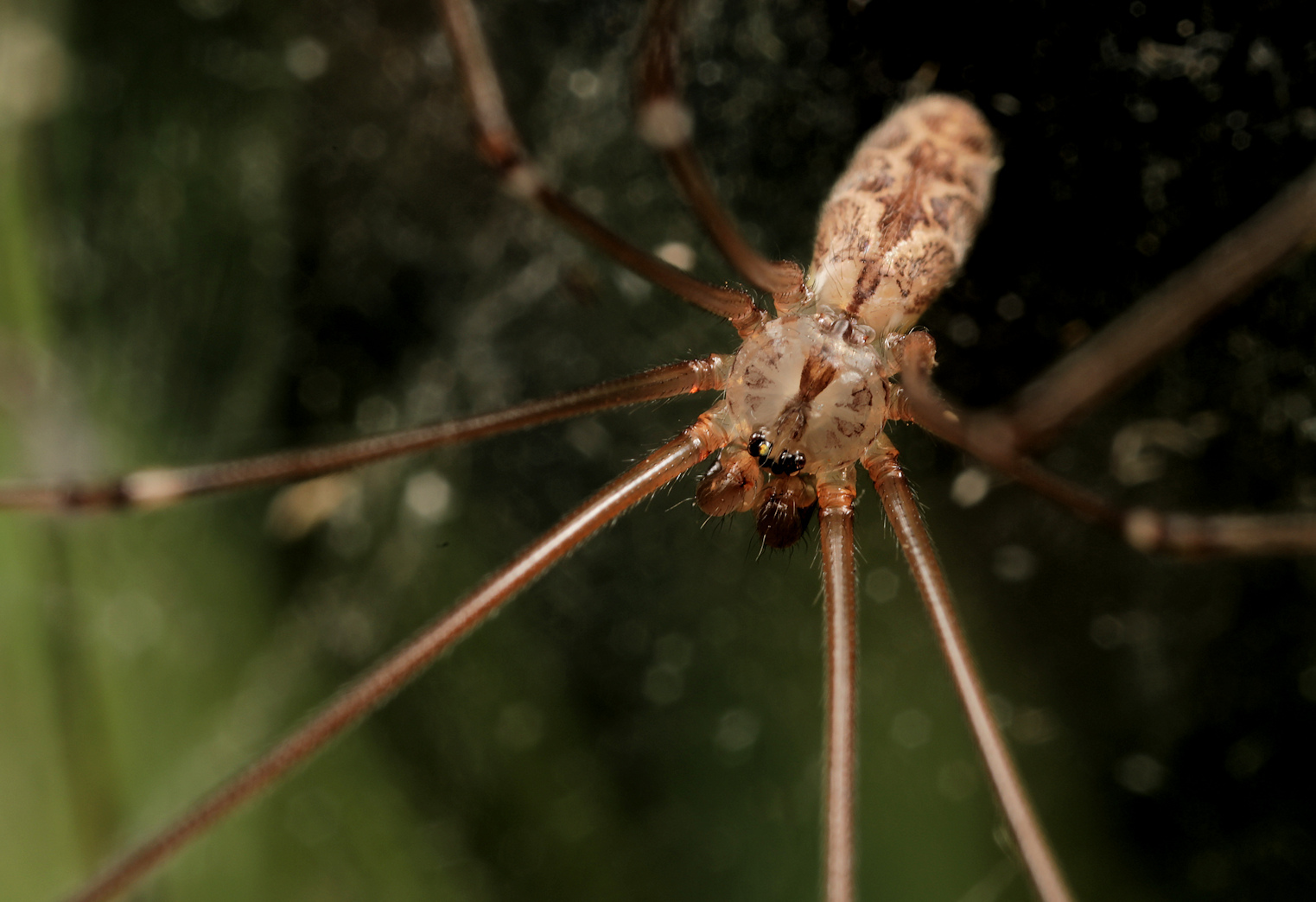
S. blyde

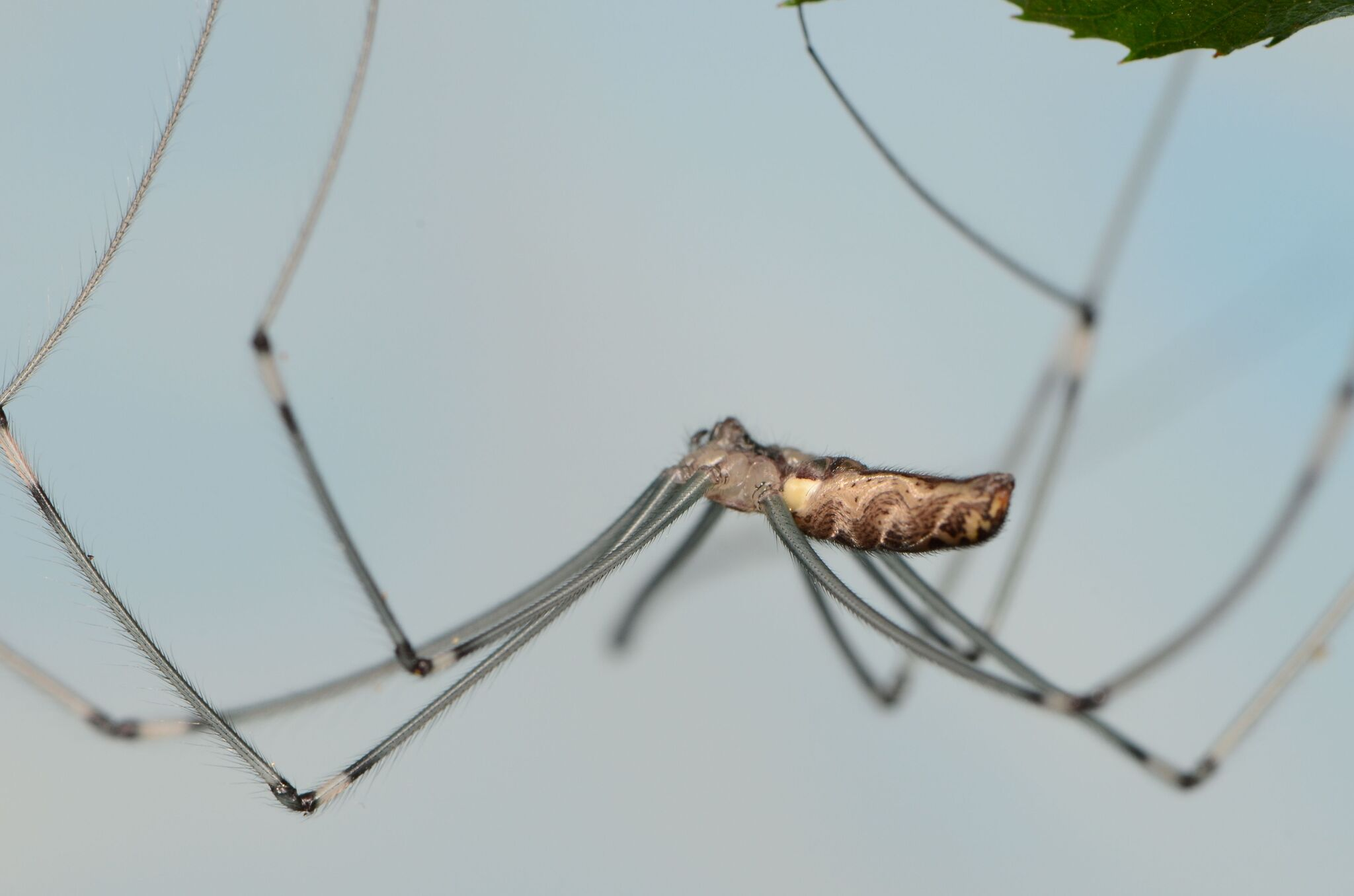
juvenile S. natalensis

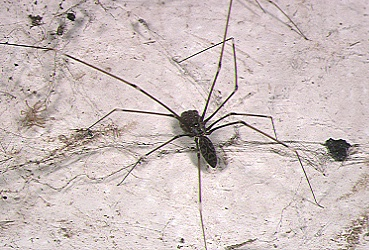
S. pallidus female with egg sac

As of October 2025, this genus includes 55 species:

- Smeringopus arambourgi Fage, 1936 – Ethiopia, Somalia
- Smeringopus atomarius Simon, 1910 – Namibia, Botswana, South Africa
- Smeringopus badplaas Huber, 2012 – South Africa
- Smeringopus blyde Huber, 2012 – South Africa
- Smeringopus bujongolo Huber, 2012 – DR Congo, Uganda
- Smeringopus butare Huber, 2012 – Congo, Rwanda, Burundi
- Smeringopus bwindi Huber, 2012 – Congo, Uganda
- Smeringopus carli Lessert, 1915 – Uganda, Tanzania, Comoros, Madagascar
- Smeringopus chibububo Huber, 2012 – Mozambique
- Smeringopus chogoria Huber, 2012 – Kenya
- Smeringopus cylindrogaster (Simon, 1907) – West, Central Africa
- Smeringopus dehoop Huber, 2012 – South Africa
- Smeringopus dundo Huber, 2012 – Congo, Angola
- Smeringopus florisbad Huber, 2012 – South Africa
- Smeringopus hanglip Huber, 2012 – South Africa
- Smeringopus harare Huber, 2012 – Zimbabwe
- Smeringopus hypocrita Simon, 1910 – Namibia, South Africa
- Smeringopus isangi Huber, 2012 – Congo
- Smeringopus kalomo Huber, 2012 – Zambia, Zimbabwe, Mozambique, Madagascar
- Smeringopus katanga Huber, 2012 – Congo
- Smeringopus koppies Huber, 2012 – Botswana, South Africa
- Smeringopus lesnei Lessert, 1936 – Mozambique, Zimbabwe
- Smeringopus lesserti Kraus, 1957 – Cameroon, Sao Tome and Principe, Gabon, DR Congo, Angola
- Smeringopus lineiventris Simon, 1890 – Yemen
- Smeringopus lotzi Huber, 2012 – South Africa
- Smeringopus lubondai Huber, 2012 – Congo
- Smeringopus luki Huber, 2012 – Congo
- Smeringopus lydenberg Huber, 2012 – South Africa
- Smeringopus mayombe Huber, 2012 – Congo
- Smeringopus mgahinga Huber, 2012 – Congo, Uganda
- Smeringopus mlilwane Huber, 2012 – Eswatini, South Africa
- Smeringopus moxico Huber, 2012 – Angola
- Smeringopus mpanga Huber, 2012 – Uganda
- Smeringopus natalensis Lawrence, 1947 – Mozambique, South Africa. Introduced to Australia
- Smeringopus ndumo Huber, 2012 – South Africa
- Smeringopus ngangao Huber, 2012 – Kenya, Tanzania
- Smeringopus oromia Huber, 2012 – Ethiopia
- Smeringopus pallidus (Blackwall, 1858) – Africa. Introduced to the Caribbean, South America, St. Helena, Sri Lanka, China, Taiwan, Laos, Philippines, Indonesia, Australia, Pacific Islands (type species)
- Smeringopus peregrinoides Kraus, 1957 – DR Congo, Uganda, Rwanda, Burundi, Kenya, Tanzania
- Smeringopus peregrinus Strand, 1906 – Kenya, Uganda, Tanzania, Madagascar
- Smeringopus principe Huber, 2012 – São Tomé and Príncipe
- Smeringopus roeweri Kraus, 1957 – Congo, Rwanda, Tanzania, Malawi
- Smeringopus rubrotinctus Strand, 1913 – Rwanda, Burundi
- Smeringopus ruhiza Huber, 2012 – Uganda, Burundi
- Smeringopus sambesicus Kraus, 1957 – Mozambique
- Smeringopus saruanle Huber, 2012 – Somalia
- Smeringopus sederberg Huber, 2012 – South Africa
- Smeringopus similis Kraus, 1957 – Namibia
- Smeringopus thomensis Simon, 1907 – São Tomé and Príncipe
- Smeringopus tombua Huber, 2012 – Angola
- Smeringopus turkana Huber, 2012 – Ethiopia, Kenya
- Smeringopus ubicki Huber, 2012 – South Africa
- Smeringopus uisib Huber, 2012 – Namibia
- Smeringopus voi Yao & Li, 2019 – Kenya
- Smeringopus zonatus Strand, 1906 – Ethiopia

== See also ==
- List of Pholcidae species
