= Victor Motschulsky =

Russian entomologist

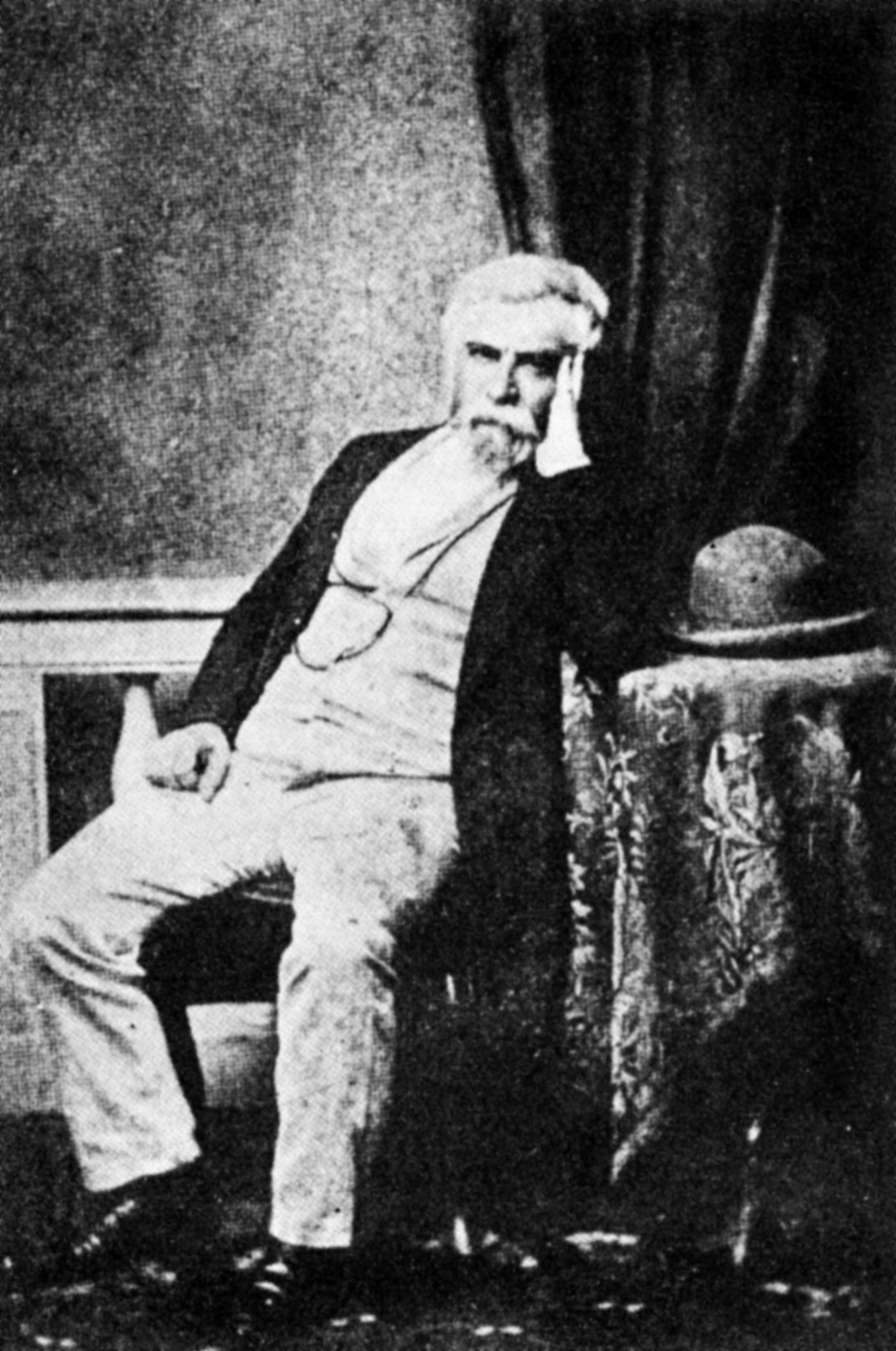
Victor Ivanovich Motschulsky

Victor Ivanovich Motschulsky, sometimes Victor von Motschulsky (Russian: Виктор Иванович Мочульский; 11 April 1810, St. Petersburg – 5 June 1871, Simferopol) was a Russian entomologist mainly interested in beetles.

Motschulsky was an Imperial Army colonel who undertook extended trips abroad. He studied and described many new beetles from Siberia, Alaska, the United States, Europe, and Asia. While he tended to ignore previous work and his own work on classification was of poor quality, Motschulsky made a massive contribution to entomology, exploring hitherto unworked regions, often in very difficult terrain. He described many new genera and species, a high proportion of which remain valid.

== Travels ==
Motschulsky's travels included:

- 1836 - France, Switzerland and the Alps, northern Italy and Austria
- 1839–1840 - Russian Caucasus, Astrakhan, Kazan and Siberia
- 1847 - Khirgizia
- 1850–1851 - Germany, Austria, Egypt, India, France, England, Belgium and Dalmatia
- 1853 - United States of America, Panama, returning to St. Petersburg via Hamburg, Kiel and Copenhagen
- 1853 - Germany, Switzerland and Austria

== Works ==
Motschulsky published 45 works, mostly on biogeographic, faunistic or systematic aspects of entomology. Many of these works are based on studies of insect collections that were created by a large number of other naturalists, especially Russians who had been to Siberia. Most of his works are on Coleoptera, but some are on Lepidoptera and Hemiptera. He also made collections of other arthropod groups such as myriapods, sometimes describing species under the name of "Victor".

A selection of more important works revealing Motschulsky's scope:

- "Insectes de la Sibérie rapportés d'un voyage fait en 1839 et 1840". Mémoires de l'Académie Impériale des Sciences de St. Pétersbourg. 13: 1–274. 1845.
- Die Kaefer Russlands. I. Insecta Carabica. Moscow: Gautier, vii + 91 pp. + 9 tables. (1850).
- "Coléoptères nouveaux de la Californie". Bulletin de la Société Impériale des Naturalistes de Moscou. 32: 122–185. 1859.
- Études entomologiques. 10 volumes (1852–1861).
- "Catalogue des insectes rapportés des environs du fleuve Amour, dépuis la Schilka jusqu'à Nikolaevsk". Bulletin de la Société Impériale des Naturalistes de Moscou. 32: 487–507. 1859.
- "Coléoptères rapportés de la Songarie par M. Semenov et décrits par V. de Motchoulski". Bulletin de l'Académie Impériale des Sciences de Saint-Pétersbourg. 1 (5): 301–304. 1859.
- "Insectes de Indes Orientales, et de contrées analogues". Études entomologiques. 8: 25–118. 1860.
- "Coléoptères rapportés en 1859 par M. Sévertsef des steppes méridionales des Kirghises et énumérés". Bulletin de l'Académie Impériale des Sciences de Saint-Pétersbourg. 2: 513–544. 1860.
- "Coleoptères rapportés en 1859 par M. Severtsef des Steppes méridionales des Kirghises". Mélanges biologiques. 3: 408–452. 1860.
- "Coléoptères rapportés de la Songarie par M. Semenov et décrits par V. de Motchoulski". Mélanges biologiques. 3: 290–309. 1860.
- Motschulsky, V. I.. "Coléoptères de la Sibérie orientale et en particulier des rives de l'Amour". In: Schrenk’s Reisen und Forschungen im Amurlande 2: 77–257, 6 color plates, St. Petersburg (1861).
- "Essai d'un Catalogue des Insectes de l'île Ceylan". Bulletin de la Société Impériale des Naturalistes de Moscou. 34 (1): 95–155. 1861.
- Catalogue des insectes reçus du Japon. Bulletin de la Société Impériale des Naturalistes de Moscou 39 (1): 163–200 (1866).

== Collection ==
Motschulsky's vast collection is divided between Moscow State University, the Zoological Museum of Saint Petersburg, the Natural History Museum of Berlin and the German Entomological Institute.

== Sources ==
- Essig, E.O., 1972. A History of Entomology. Hafner Publishing Co., New York. 1,029 pp.
