= Microctenonyx =

Scientific classification
- Kingdom: Animalia
- Phylum: Arthropoda
- Subphylum: Chelicerata
- Class: Arachnida
- Order: Araneae
- Infraorder: Araneomorphae
- Family: Linyphiidae
- Genus: Microctenonyx; Dahl, 1886

Type species
- M. subitaneus (O. Pickard-Cambridge, 1875)

Species
- 4, see text

Synonyms
- Alaxchelicera Butler, 1932; Aulacocyba Simon, 1926

Genus of spiders

Microctenonyx is a genus of dwarf spiders that was first described by Friedrich Dahl in 1886.

== Species ==
As of May 2019 it contains four species:

- Microctenonyx apuliae (Caporiacco, 1951) – Italy
- Microctenonyx cavifrons (Caporiacco, 1935) – Karakorum
- Microctenonyx evansae (Locket & Russell-Smith, 1980) – Nigeria
- Microctenonyx subitaneus (O. Pickard-Cambridge, 1875) (type) – Europe, Macaronesia, North Africa to Kyrgyzstan. Introduced to USA, South Africa, Australia, New Zealand
