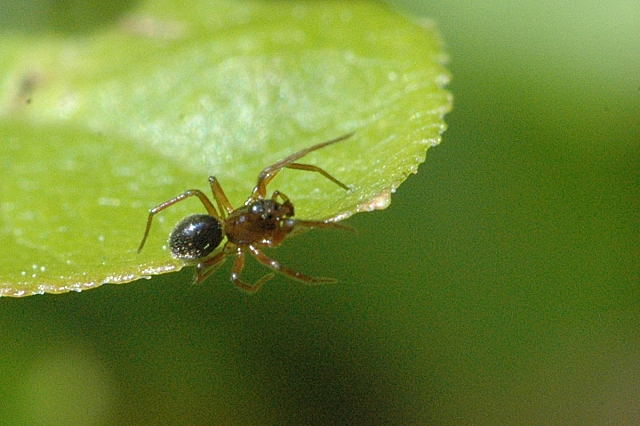
- Trematocephalus cristatus, male

Scientific classification
- Domain: Eukaryota
- Kingdom: Animalia
- Phylum: Arthropoda
- Subphylum: Chelicerata
- Class: Arachnida
- Order: Araneae
- Infraorder: Araneomorphae
- Family: Linyphiidae
- Genus: Trematocephalus; Dahl, 1886

Type species
- T. cristatus (Wider, 1834)

Species
- 4, see text

= Trematocephalus =

Genus of spiders

Trematocephalus is a genus of sheet weavers first described by Friedrich Dahl in 1886.

== Species ==
As of 2017, it contains only four species:

- Trematocephalus cristatus (Wider, 1834) — Palearctic. "A striking red and blue-black money spider with a hole straight through its head."
- Trematocephalus obscurus Denis, 1950 — France
- Trematocephalus simplex Simon, 1894 — Sri Lanka
- Trematocephalus tripunctatus Simon, 1894 — Sri Lanka
