= Rosemary Gillespie (biologist) =

American evolutionary biologist

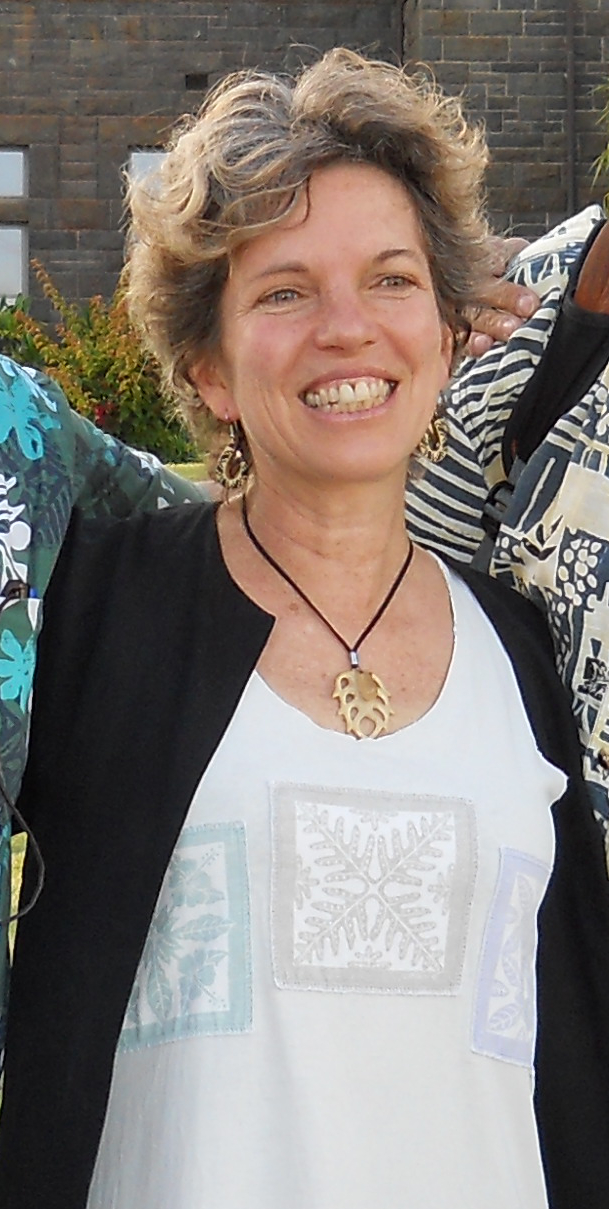
- Dr. Rosemary Gillespie attends Pacific Island Research Conference, Hawaii in 2011.
- Born: Scotland

Academic background
- Education: University of Edinburgh
- Alma mater: University of Tennessee

Academic work
- Discipline: Evolutionary biology
- Institutions: University of California, Berkeley; University of Hawaii at Manoa

Rosemary Gillespie is an evolutionary biologist and professor of Environmental Science, Policy & Management, Division of Insect Biology at the University of California, Berkeley. She was the President of the American Genetics Association in 2018 and was previously President of the International Biogeography Society 2013–2015. From 2011 to 2013 she had served at the president of the American Arachnological Society. As of 2020 she is the faculty director of the Essig Museum of Entomology and a Professor and Schlinger Chair in systematic entomology at the University of California, Berkeley. Gillespie is known for her work on the evolution of communities on hotspot archipelagoes.

== Education and previous employment ==
She was born and raised in Scotland. In 1980, she received her B.SC in zoology at the University of Edinburgh, Scotland. Gillespie moved to the United States to study the behavioral ecology of arachnids at the University of Tennessee-Knoxville where she earned her Ph.D. She then worked with the University of the South, Sewanee, Tennessee. She went on to work as a postdoctoral researcher in 1987 at the University of Hawaii, working closely with The Nature Conservancy of Hawaii, based on the island of Maui. She took an appointment of Assistant Professor at the University of Hawaii at Manoa in 1992. She left Hawaii and moved to the University of California at Berkeley in 1999. As of 2002, Gillespie is the faculty director at the Department of Environmental Science, Policy and Management at UC Berkeley.

== Research ==
External videos
- "The World's Biota: Rosemary Gillespie", October 4, 2017, University of California, Berkeley
- "Ecology, Evolution, and Species Diversification in Hawaiian Islands", Rosemary Gillespie, June 7, 2016, Harvard Museum of Natural History

Gillespie's research program is aimed at understanding what drives biological diversification, particularly at the level of populations and species. She uses islands of known age and isolation to assess the combined temporal and spatial dimension of biogeography and determine patterns of diversification, adaptive radiation, and associated community assembly with a focus on spiders and insects. Most of her work has been in the Hawaiian Islands, though she has also worked in French Polynesia, Fiji, Pohnpei, and Kosrae. Themes include adaptive radiation and community assembly on islands with emphasis on patterns of repeated evolution of similar forms, the rate of species accumulation and approach to equilibrium within an island system, and mechanisms of dispersal to the islands. Most of her work has been on spiders, in particular species in the genus Tetragnatha (Tetragnathidae). She also works on the evolution of diversity within species, with the primary focus here on color polymorphism in the Hawaiian Happy face spider which has evolved the same color polymorphism independently on different islands, and the research aims to uncover the molecular basis for the modification. She currently has a large program examining the importance of priority, sequence, abundance, and interaction strengths in determining how biological communities develop, and how this might render them resilient to intrusion by non-native species.

== Science communication ==
Gillespie led "Exploring California Biodiversity" (2003-2016), a National Science Foundation (NSF)-funded museum and field-based outreach program focused on graduate fellows and high-school/middle-school students in minority-dominated urban schools in the Bay Area. The project forged connections between the university and the surrounding community, enriching K-12 science education, and training graduate students to be better communicators of science. Prior to moving to UC Berkeley she was part of an effort for Using Hawaii's Unique Biota for Biology Education, an NSF program that worked with underrepresented Pacific Island students. She also led or co-led several programs to encourage participation of underrepresented minorities in higher education, including an NSF-funded Undergraduate Mentoring in Environmental Biology program that encouraged Pacific Islander undergraduates to undertake field and laboratory research in biology. She was awarded NSF's Presidential Award for Excellence in Science, Mathematics, and Engineering Mentoring (PAESMEM) in Nov 2005. In 2026, Gillespie was awarded the 2025 Molecular Ecology Prize.

== Awards ==
- 2005 National Science Foundation Presidential Award for Excellence in Science, Mathematics and Engineering Mentoring
- 2019 IBS Alfred Russel Wallace Award
- 2025 Molecular Ecology Prize
