= Iranian Arachnological Society =

Academic society in Iran

The Iranian Arachnological Society (IAS) was founded in 2010 as an academic society for amateur and professional arachnologists and individuals interested in Arachnids (including spiders, scorpions, harvestmen, ticks, mites and Solifugae) in order to promote the arachnological studies in Iran and facilitate the collaborations between Iranian and international arachnologists, researchers and institutions around the world.

== History ==
IAS was founded on 20 October 2010 by "Mohammad Marhabaie" and "Majid Moradmand".

== See also ==
- International Society of Arachnology
- Arachnology
