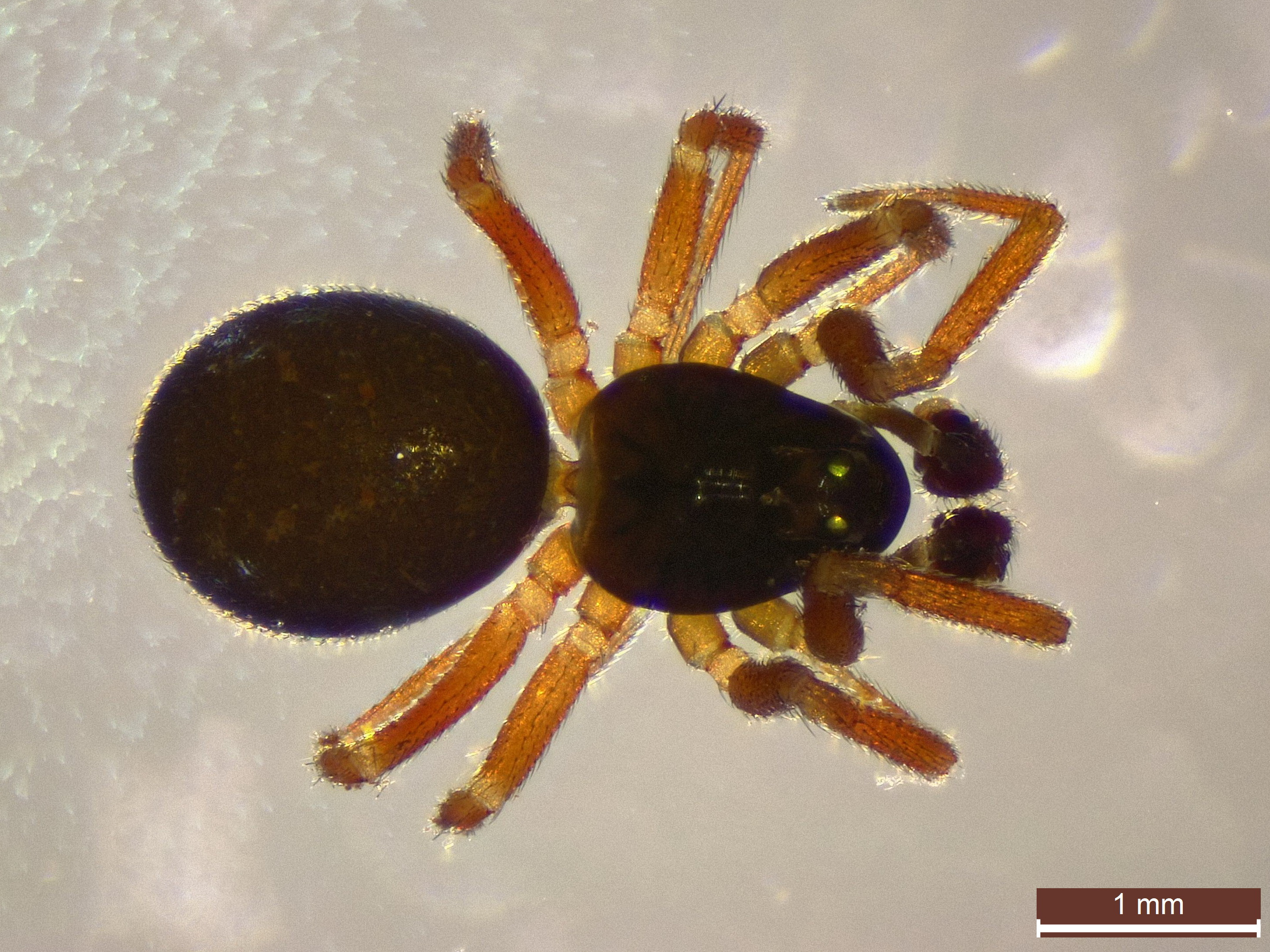
- E. hiemalis

Scientific classification
- Kingdom: Animalia
- Phylum: Arthropoda
- Subphylum: Chelicerata
- Class: Arachnida
- Order: Araneae
- Infraorder: Araneomorphae
- Family: Linyphiidae
- Genus: Erigonella; Dahl, 1901

Type species
- E. hiemalis (Blackwall, 1841)

Species
- 5, see text

= Erigonella =

Genus of spiders

Erigonella is a genus of dwarf spiders that was first described by David B. Hirst in 1901.

== Species ==
As of May 2019 it contains five species and one subspecies:

- Erigonella groenlandica Strand, 1905 – Canada
- Erigonella hiemalis (Blackwall, 1841) (type) – Europe
- Erigonella ignobilis (O. Pickard-Cambridge, 1871) – Europe, Russia (Europe to South Siberia)
- Erigonella stubbei Heimer, 1987 – Mongolia
- Erigonella subelevata (L. Koch, 1869) – Europe
  - Erigonella s. pyrenaea Denis, 1964 – France
