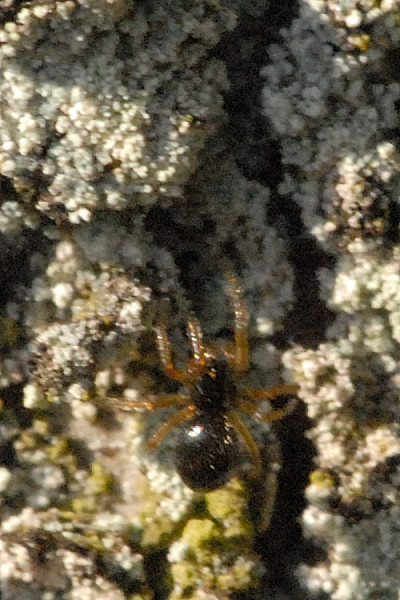
- M. penicillata

Scientific classification
- Kingdom: Animalia
- Phylum: Arthropoda
- Subphylum: Chelicerata
- Class: Arachnida
- Order: Araneae
- Infraorder: Araneomorphae
- Family: Linyphiidae
- Genus: Moebelia; Dahl, 1886

Type species
- M. penicillata (Westring, 1851)

Species
- 3, see text

Synonyms
- Araeoncoides Wunderlich, 1969

= Moebelia =

Genus of spiders

Moebelia is a genus of dwarf spiders that was first described by Friedrich Dahl in 1886.

== Species ==
As of May 2019 it contains three species:

- Moebelia berolinensis (Wunderlich, 1969) – Germany
- Moebelia penicillata (Westring, 1851) (type) – Europe, Caucasus
- Moebelia rectangula Song & Li, 2007 – China
