= Australasian Arachnological Society =

The Australasian Arachnological Society is a body dedicated to promotion of knowledge and study of arachnids (spiders and other 8-legged arthropods) in the Australasian realm, which includes Australia, New Zealand, South-east Asia, Oceania and the Pacific Islands. Membership is open to all individuals and scientific institutions. The Society maintains a large library of reference books and scientific journals housed at Queensland Museum. The society is informally structured to promote the study of arachnology to amateurs, students, professionals and institutions.

The Society was founded by Robert Raven in 1979. The first national meeting was held in 1989 as a special symposium of the 17th Annual General Meeting of the Australian Entomological Society in Tanunda, South Australia. A second meeting was convened on the periphery of the 12th International Congress of Arachnology, held in Brisbane in July 1992 by the International Society of Arachnology. Other meetings have included one in Canberra on the occasion of the Invertebrate Biodiversity and Conservation Conference in December 2005, and joint participation with the Australian Entomological Society in a conference at Hobart in 2012. Since 1979 many members have acted in administrative roles with no formal structure in place. In 1996 Volker Framenau took on the secretariat with assistance from other members, notably Cor Vink. Dr Michael Rix took on the role of newsletter editor in November 2009, with Volker Framenau staying on as administrator. In 2009 Robert Whyte and Helen Smith took on the responsibility of administration and newsletter, Australasian Arachnology, which has been regularly published since 1979. Membership fees entitles members to a number of issues of the newsletter which is delivered as a PDF. Membership is not time based.

== Newsletter ==
- Newsletter 89 (Winter 2020)
- Newsletter 88 (Spring 2019)
- Newsletter 87 (December 2018)
- Newsletter 86 (September 2015)
- Newsletter 85 (June 2013)
- Newsletter 84 (August 2012)
- Newsletter 83 (February 2012)
- Newsletter 82 (August 2011)
- Newsletter 81 (February 2011)
- Newsletter 80 August 2010)
- Newsletter 79 (November 2009)
- Newsletter 78 (January 2008)
- Newsletter 77 (April 2007)
- Newsletter 76 (January 2007)
- Newsletter 75 (September 2006)
- Newsletter 74 (April 2006)
- Newsletter 73 January 2006)
- Newsletter 72 August 2005)
- Newsletter 71 (April 2005)
- Newsletter 70 (December 2004)
- Newsletter 69 (May 2004)
- Newsletter 68 (October 2003)
- Newsletter 67 (June 2003)
- Newsletter 66 (February 2003)
- Newsletter 65 (October 2002)
- Newsletter 64 (July 2002)
- Newsletter 63 (April 2002)
- Newsletter 62 (August 2001)
- Newsletter 61 (January 2001)
- Newsletter 60 (October 2000)
- Newsletter 59 (June 2000)
- Newsletter 58 (March 2000)
- Newsletter 57 (November 1999)
- Newsletter 56 (July 1999)
- Newsletter 55 (April 1999)
- Newsletter 54 (August 1998)
- Newsletter 53 (September 1997)
- Newsletter 52 (March 1997)
- Newsletter 51 (April 1996)
- Newsletter 49 (April 1995)
- Newsletter 48 (August 1994)
- Newsletter 47 (August 1993)
- Newsletter 46 (April 1993)
- Newsletter 45 (October 1992)
- Newsletter 44 (May 1992)
- Newsletter 43 (December 1991)
- Newsletter 42 (September 1991)
- Newsletter 41 (June 1991)
- Newsletter 40 (March 1991)
- Newsletter 39 (December 1990)
- Newsletter 38 (August 1990)
- Newsletter 37 (April 1990)
- Newsletter 36 (April 1989)
- Newsletter 34 (October 1988)
- Newsletter 33 (July 1988)
- Newsletter 32 (April 1988)
- Newsletter 31 (January 1988)
- Newsletter 30 (October 1987)
- Newsletter 29 (July 1987)
- Newsletter 28 (April 1987)
- Newsletter 27 (January 1987)
- Newsletter 26 (October 1986)
- Newsletter 25 (July 1986)
- Newsletter 24 (April 1986)
- Newsletter 23 (January 1986)
- Newsletter 22 (October 1985)
- Newsletter 20 (April 1985)
- Newsletter 19 (July 1985)
- Newsletter 18 (October 1984)
- Newsletter 17 (July 1984)
- Newsletter 16 (April 1984)
- Newsletter 15 (January 1984)
- Newsletter 14 (October 1983)
- Newsletter 13 (July 1983)
- Newsletter 12 (April 1983)
- Newsletter 11 (January 1983)
- Newsletter 10 (November 1982)
- Newsletter 10 (November 1982)
- Newsletter 9 (July-August 1982)
- Newsletter 8 (April 1982)
- Newsletter 7 (January 1982)
- Newsletter 6 (August 1981)
- Newsletter 5 (April 1981)
- Newsletter 4 (February 1981)
- Newsletter 3 (September 1980)
- Newsletter 2 (May 1980)
- Newsletter 1 (November 1979)
