= American Arachnological Society =

- Formation: 1972
- Website: http://www.americanarachnology.org

The American Arachnological Society (AAS) is a scientific organization founded in 1972 in order to promote the study of arachnids by seeking to achieve closer cooperation and understanding between amateur and professional arachnologists along with publication of the Journal of Arachnology. The society holds annual meetings around the United States and membership is open to all individuals who share the common objectives held by the society.

== History ==
Beatrice Vogel authored A History of the American Arachnological Society 1900 - 1975.

== Publications ==
The AAS publishes the Spiders of North America - An Identification Manual, and three times a year publishes the Journal of Arachnology, a peer-reviewed publication.

== Selected publications ==
- Ubick, Darrell; Cushing, Paula (2005), Spiders of North America: an identification manual, American Arachnological Society, ISBN 978-0-9771439-0-0

== See also ==
- International Society of Arachnology
