= Trematocephalus simplex =

Scientific classification
- Kingdom: Animalia
- Phylum: Arthropoda
- Subphylum: Chelicerata
- Class: Arachnida
- Order: Araneae
- Infraorder: Araneomorphae
- Family: Linyphiidae
- Genus: Trematocephalus
- Species: T. simplex

Binomial name
- Trematocephalus simplex Simon, 1894

Species of spider

Trematocephalus simplex, is a species of spider of the genus Trematocephalus. It is endemic to Sri Lanka.
