= Maria Dahl =

German zoologist

Maria Johanna Dahl
- Maria Johanna Grosset
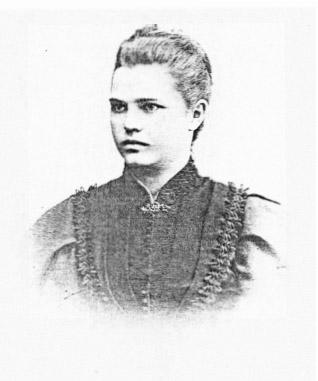
- Born: 26 July 1872; Boromlia, Poltava region, Russian Empire
- Died: 6 January 1972 (aged 99)
- Citizenship: Germany
- Known for: Die Tierwelt Deutschlands
- Spouse: Friedrich Dahl
- Scientific career
- Fields: zoology, arachnology, carcinology

Maria Johanna Dahl, née Grosset (26 July 1872, in Boromlya, Poltava Region – 6 January 1972) was a Ukrainian-born German zoologist, arachnologist, and carcinologist. Along with her husband, Friedrich Dahl, she was a co-author and editor of the zoological series Die Tierwelt Deutschlands, published between 1925 and 1968.

== Life ==
Maria Johanna Grosset was born on 26 July 1872 in Boromlya, Russian Empire (currently in Poltava Region, Ukraine). She was an honor graduate from the Girls Gymnasium in Kharkiv. In 1889, Grosset became a teacher of culture.

In 1890, Grosset immigrated with her family to Kiel, Germany, where she attended a vocational school. She planned to study medicine, however, at that time only men could attend medical schools in Germany. In 1891, Groset had to retake the exams, as her Russian diploma was not recognized in Germany.

On 19 June 1899 Grosset married Friedrich Dahl. The couple had four children.

Due to Friedrich Dahl's health problems, the Dahl family moved to Greifswald where Dahl continued to live after her husband's death in 1929.

Maria Dahl died on 6 January 1972 at the age of 99.

== Career ==
From 1892 to 1899 Dahl was employed as an assistant to Karl Brandt at Zoological institute in Kiel where she was working with the collections from the 1889-90 Plankton-Expedition.

In the two decades after getting married in 1899, Dahl was mainly occupied by the birth and education of her four children. However, around 1907 her husband, Friedrich Dahl, encouraged her to pursue the work he had started on the corycacid copepods of the Plankton-Expedition. Working at home, by 1912 Dahl had completed a monograph of excellence, planned as one part of the series. In the foreword to her analysis of the copepod genus Corycacinen, Dahl apologized for not having a PhD in zoology and for taking too long to complete the task.

After World War I Dahl was engaged in arachnid research along with her husband. In 1920, Dahl began her research at the University of Berlin and was occupied with it until 1925.

Dahl's and her husband's joint research culminated in publishing Die Tierwelt Deutschlands in 1925. Friedrich Dahl was its founder and author of the first three volumes, while Maria co-authored the fifth volume and edited 15 volumes. A review in Nature called Die Tierwelt Deutschlands "a reference book necessary to every library of zoology", noting that "each species is given an excellent and well-illustrated systematic description". After Friedrich Dahl’s death in 1929, Dahl continued editing Die Tierwelt Deutschlands until 1968.

Dahl also published several works on spiders and finished editing her husband’s book on Melanesia.

== List of works ==
Selected works:

- 1926 – Dahl (M.) (Maria), Spinentiere oder Arachnoidea. I.Spring-spinnen (Salticidae). Tierw. Deuts., 1926, pp. 1–55, 159 fig.
- 1927 – Dahl (M.), vide DAHL (F.) & Maria DAHL, 1927.
- 1928 – Dahl (M.), Einige Lebendbeobachtungen an Argiope lobata (Arachneae, Argiopidae). Zool. Anz., 75 (3–4), pp. 79–85
- 1928 – Dahl (M.), Spinnen (Araneae) von Nowaja-Semlja. Norsk. Vid. Akard. Oslo, 1928, pp. 1–37.
- 1931 – Dahl (M.), Spinnentiere oder Arachnoidea. VI. 24 Familie: Agelenidae. Tierw. Deuts., 1931, pp. 1–46, 76 fig.
- 1933 – Dahl (M.), Spinnen (Araneae). in The Norwegian North Polar Expedition with the Maud 1918–1925, Scientific Results, 5 (16), pp. 3–4.
- 1935 – Dahl (M.), Zur Kenntnis der Spinnentiere Schlesiens. A. Araneae und Opiliones. Sitz-ber. Ges naturf. Freu. Berlin, 1935, pp. 337–353.
- 1937 – Dahl (M.), Spinnentiere oder Arachnoidea. VIII. 19 Familie: Hahniidae. Tierw. Deuts., 1937, pp. 100–114, 33 fig.
- 1937 – Dahl (M.), Spinnentiere oder Arachnoidea. VIII. 20 Familie: Argyronetidae. Tierw. Deuts., 1937, pp. 115–118, fig.34–38.
- 1938 – Dahl (M.), Zur Verbreitung der Gattung Porrhomma in deutschen Höhlen, Stollen, Bergwerten und Kellern und deren freilebenden Arten. Mitt. Höhl. u. Karstjorsch., 1938, pp. 122 132, 9 fig.
