= Boromlia =

Village in Sumy Oblast, Ukraine

Boromlia Боромля
- Village
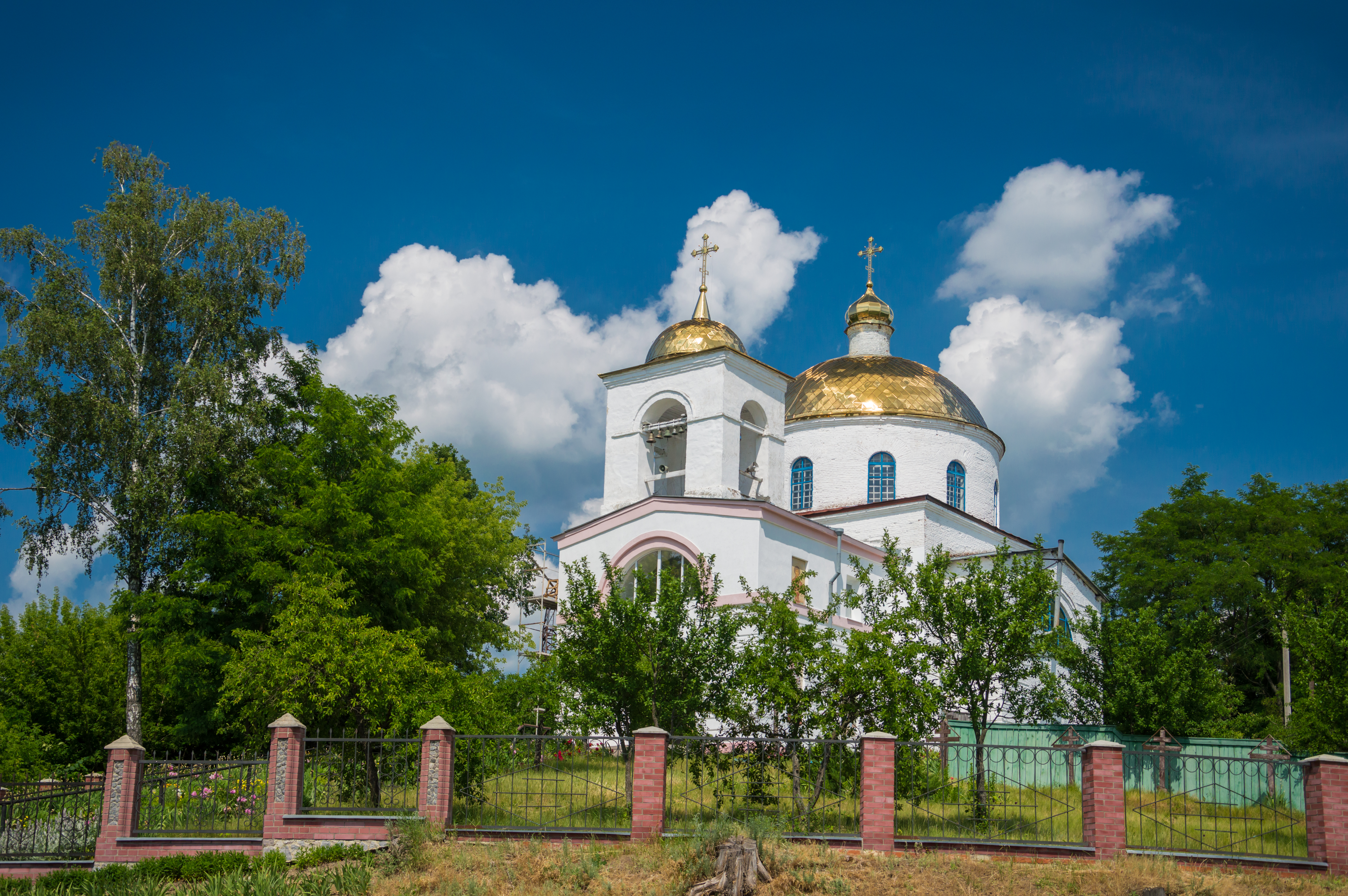
- The Church of the Ascension of the Cross in Boromlia

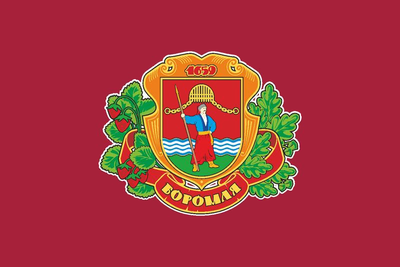
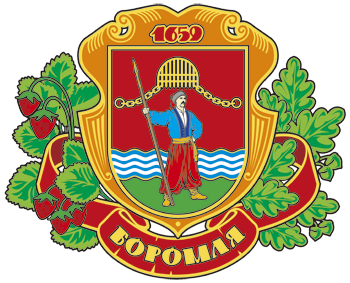
- Flag Coat of arms

- Location of Boromlia in Sumy Oblast Location of Boromlia in Ukraine
- Coordinates: 50°37′38″N 34°58′23″E
- Country: Ukraine
- Oblast: Sumy Oblast
- Raion: Okhtyrka Raion
- Hromada: Boromlia rural hromada
- Established: 1658

Population
  - Total: 4,270

Boromlia or Boromlya (Ukrainian: Боромля) is a village in Okhtyrka Raion, in Ukraine's central Sumy Oblast. It is the administrative centre of Boromlia rural hromada, one of the hromadas of Ukraine. Its population is 4,270 (as of 2023).

== History ==
Boromlia was established by Cossack ataman Korney Vasilyev, along with 425 other Cossacks, who settled on the banks of the Boromlia river. The settlement was formally established in 1658 with the issuance of a royal charter by Russian Tsar Alexis. The Church of the Ascension of the Cross, part of the Ukrainian Orthodox Church (Moscow Patriarchate), was built between 1696 and 1726.

Since the 19th century, Boromlia has been home to an active community of strawberry farmers. Since 1908 there have been annual strawberry exhibitions in the village.

=== Russian invasion of Ukraine ===
Boromlia was hit by Russian airstrikes on 3 and 5 March 2022, which damaged gas and electrical infrastructure along with a kindergarten and about 140 houses, according to Vasyl Romanika, the head of the village administration.

The village was occupied by Russia from 9 to 26 March, during the country's invasion of Ukraine. According to Romanika, four people were tortured and killed during the occupation.

== Notable people ==
- Andrii Alymov, Soviet epidemiologist and microbiologist
- Serhii Alymov, Soviet writer
- Job (Bazilevich), Russian Orthodox archbishop of Pereiaslav and Boryspil
- Grigory Bazilevich, Russian military surgeon
- Vitaliy Butrym, Ukrainian Olympic 400-metre sprinter
- Yakim Butrym, colonel of the Ukrainian People's Army
- Maria Dahl, German zoologist
- Vasyl Fedorko, Ukrainian People's Army leader and diaspora activist
- Yevheniia Semenenko, sergeant of the Armed Forces of Ukraine
- Ivan Shapovalov, junior sergeant of the Armed Forces of Ukraine, one of the Cyborg during the Second Battle of Donetsk Airport
