= Essig Museum of Entomology =

Insect museum at the University of California at Berkeley, United States

Coordinates: 37.8713°N 122.2621°W

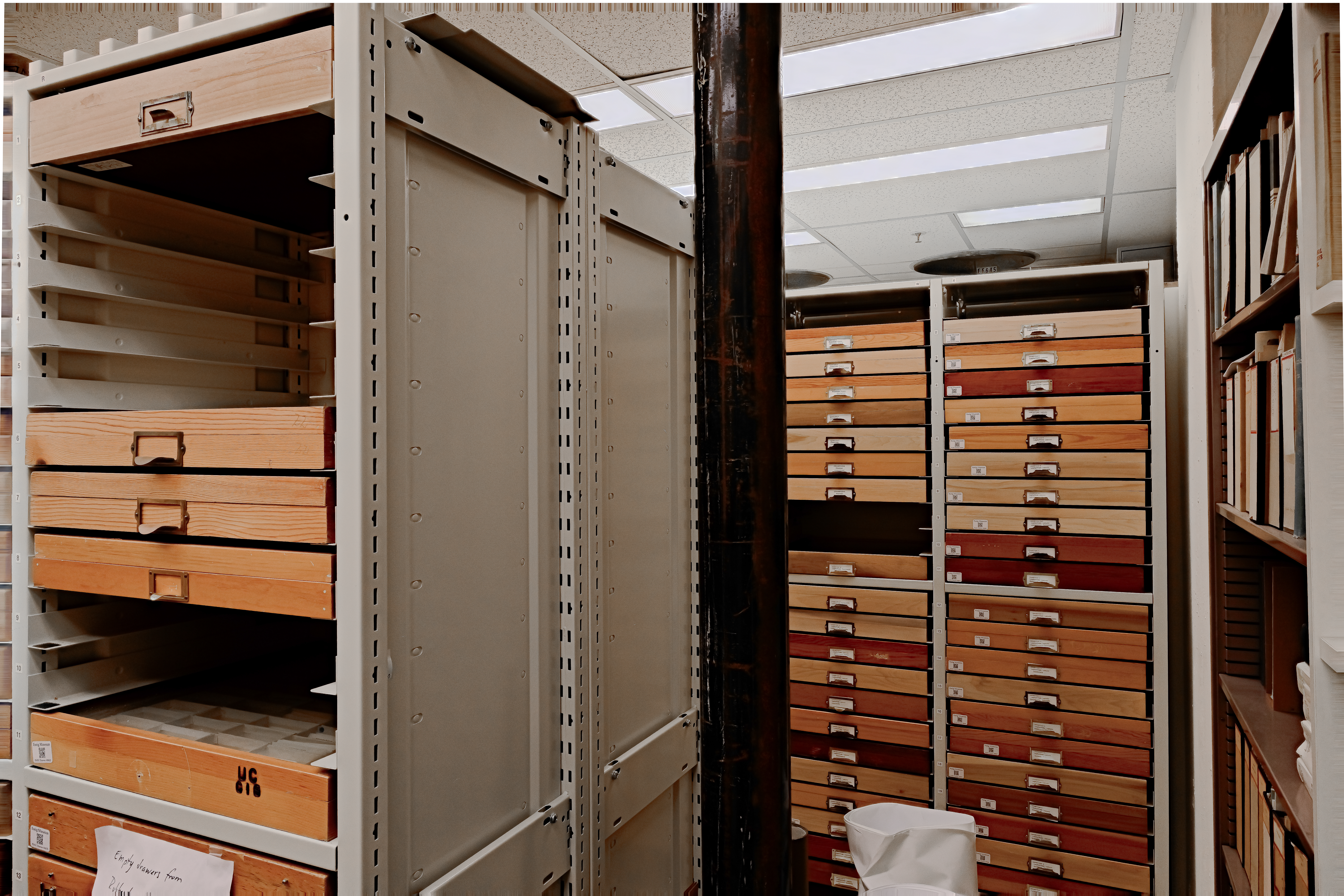
Interior of the Essig Museum, by Hugo Sappington 2023

The Essig Museum of Entomology is a research museum dedicated to terrestrial arthropods, located at the University of California at Berkeley. It contains perhaps the world's largest collection of California insects and has been ranked among the top university-based collections in North America. The museum is open to the public twice per year (Cal Day and Darwin Day).

The museum's origins date back to the 1880s, with the university's earliest teaching collection. After entomologist Edward Oliver Essig joined the faculty in 1914, he began to expand its collections. The research collection, starting with 10,000-15,000 specimens, was formalized in 1939 as part of the California Insect Survey (Experiment Station Project 1205), and in 1972 was named the Essig Museum of Entomology. Historically, the museum's primary geographical emphasis has been on western North America, with a focus on surveying the insects of California. More recently that focus has broadened to the eastern Pacific Rim, particularly Mexico, Costa Rica, Chile, and the Pacific Basin islands.

== Collections ==
Over 5 million pinned specimens comprise the majority of the collection. Large microscope slide and alcohol-preserved collections are also maintained, as well as thousands of specimens in envelopes and Riker mounts. Special collections include:

- H. Edwin Cott Thysanoptera Collection
- Edward O. Essig Aphididae Collection
- Gordon F. Ferris Anoplura (Phthiraptera) and Ectoparasitic Diptera Collections
- Deane P. Furman Parasitic Acari Collection
- Dilworth D. Jensen Psyllidae Collection
- Vernon L. Kellogg Mallophaga (Phthiraptera) Collection
- A. Earl Pritchard Acari Collection
- Evert I. Schlinger Aphid Parasitoid Collection
- Morris A. Stewart Siphonaptera Collection
- Robert L. Usinger Heteroptera Collection
- Hastings Natural History Reservation Collections

As part of a citizen-scientist (crowd sourcing) project, museum researchers are working on digital cataloging eight major insect collections.
