= Microctenonyx subitaneus =

Scientific classification
- Domain: Eukaryota
- Kingdom: Animalia
- Phylum: Arthropoda
- Subphylum: Chelicerata
- Class: Arachnida
- Order: Araneae
- Infraorder: Araneomorphae
- Family: Linyphiidae
- Genus: Microctenonyx
- Species: M. subitaneus

Binomial name
- Microctenonyx subitaneus (Pickard-Cambridge, 1875)

Synonyms
- Erigone alexandrina; Erigone pulicaria; Erigone subitanea; Walckenaera subitanea; Plaesiocraerus pulicarius; Tapinocyba subitanea; Tapinocyba parisiensis; Tapinocyba alexandrina; Dactylopisthes pauper; Microctenonyx subitaneus; Lophocarenum domiciliorum; Aulacocyba subitanea; Aulacocyba parisiensis; Alioranus pauper; Alaxchelicera ordinaria; Troxochrus subitaneus; Gongylidiellum maderianum

Species of spider

Microctenonyx subitaneus is a species of sheet weaver spider.

== Taxonomy ==
This species was described as Erigone alexandrina in 1875 by Octavius Pickard-Cambridge.

== Distribution ==
This species is known from Europe, Macaronesia, North Africa to Kyrgyzstan. It has been introduced to USA, Chile, Argentina, Kenya, South Africa, Australia, New Zealand.
