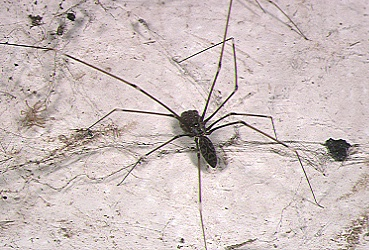
- Female with eggsac

Scientific classification
- Domain: Eukaryota
- Kingdom: Animalia
- Phylum: Arthropoda
- Subphylum: Chelicerata
- Class: Arachnida
- Order: Araneae
- Infraorder: Araneomorphae
- Family: Pholcidae
- Genus: Smeringopus
- Species: S. pallidus

Binomial name
- Smeringopus pallidus (Blackwall, 1858)

= Smeringopus pallidus =

Pale daddy-long-leg

Species of spider

Smeringopus pallidus, known as the pale daddy-long-leg, is a species of spider of the genus Smeringopus, family Pholcidae. It is a cosmopolitan species found in many countries.

== Description ==
This species has a body length up to 7 mm, with males being smaller than females. It has a cylindrical and elongate abdomen. The purple spots along the dorsal surface of the abdomen are a characteristic feature. There is a dark stripe on the ventral surface of the sternum. A synanthropic spider, it builds irregular cobwebs in sheltered areas to capture small insects and other spiders for food. The legs lack spines and have a few vertical hairs. The female has a simple epigynum without pockets.

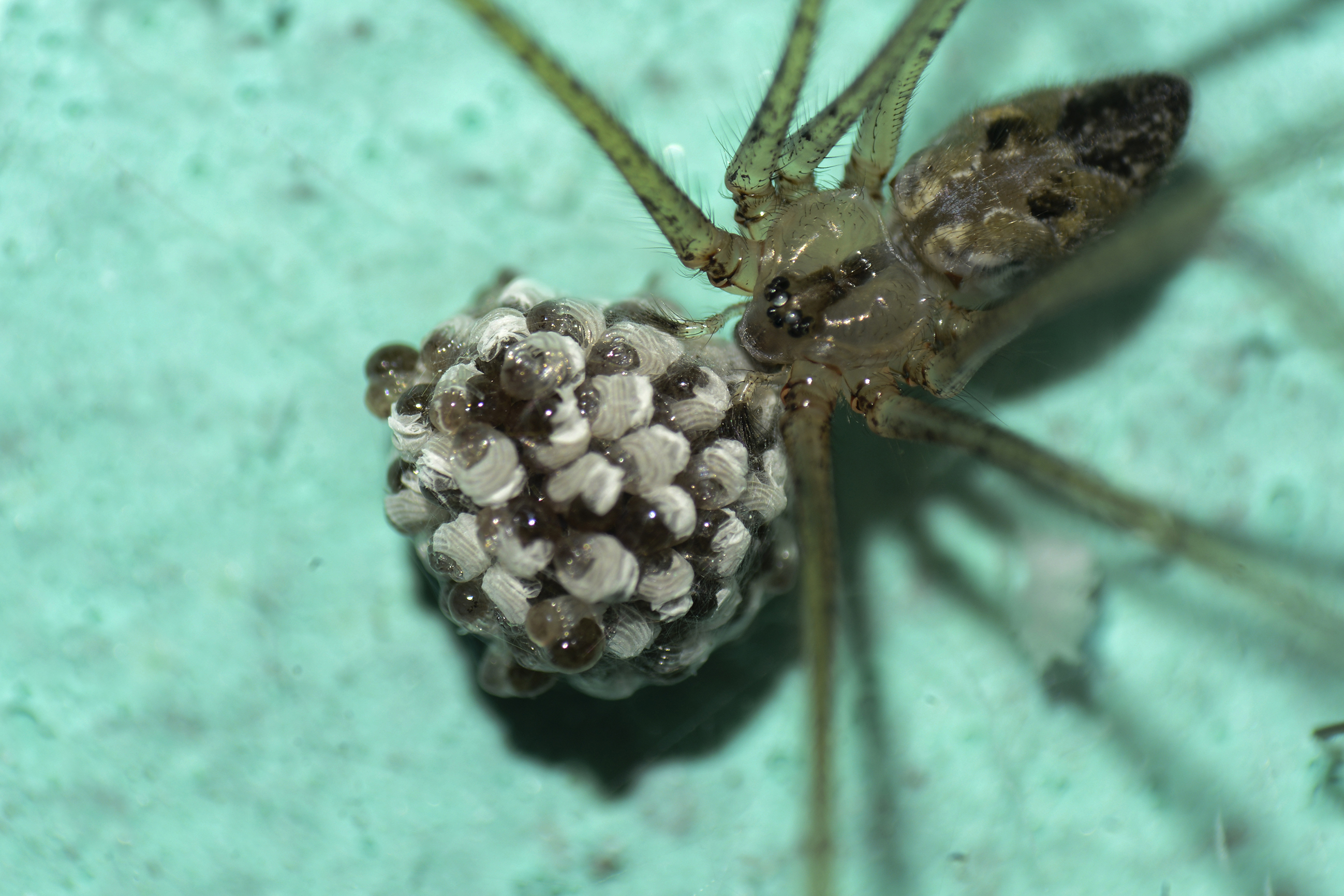
Pale daddy-long-leg with eggs

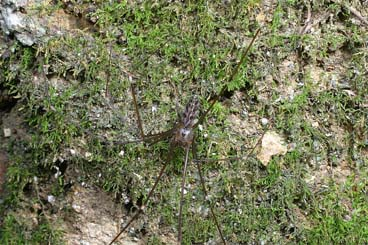
Male

== Habitat ==
Smeringopus pallidus can be found in dusty and dark corners of the house. They also build their webs under covered drains and on mud walls in gardens and the countryside. When disturbed, they hang upside down in the web and vibrate themselves vigorously to confuse the intruder.

== See also ==
- List of Pholcidae species
