= Serket (journal) =

- Discipline: Arachnology
- Language: English
- Edited by: Hisham K. El-Hennawy

Publication details
- History: 1987-present
- Publisher: Self published (Egypt)
- Frequency: Biannually

Standard abbreviations
- ISO 4: Serket

Indexing
- ISSN: 1110-502X

Links
- Journal homepage; Tables of contents

Serket, The Arachnological Bulletin of the Middle East and North Africa, is a biannual peer-reviewed scientific journal on arachnology. It was established in August 1987 in Egypt, taking its name from the ancient Egyptian for a scorpion.

== Abstracting and indexing ==
The journal is abstracted and indexed in:

- Entomology Abstracts
- Industrial and Applied Microbiology Abstracts
- Virology and AIDS Abstracts
- The Zoological Record
