= Pierre Bonnet (naturalist) =

French arachnologist (1897–1990)

- Born: Pierre Numa Louis Bonnet; 1 September 1897; Villefranche-de-Rouergue
- Died: 16 August 1990 (aged 92); Toulouse
- Occupation: Arachnologist, university teacher
- Works: Bibliographia Araneorum
- Awards: Croix de guerre 1914–1918

Signature
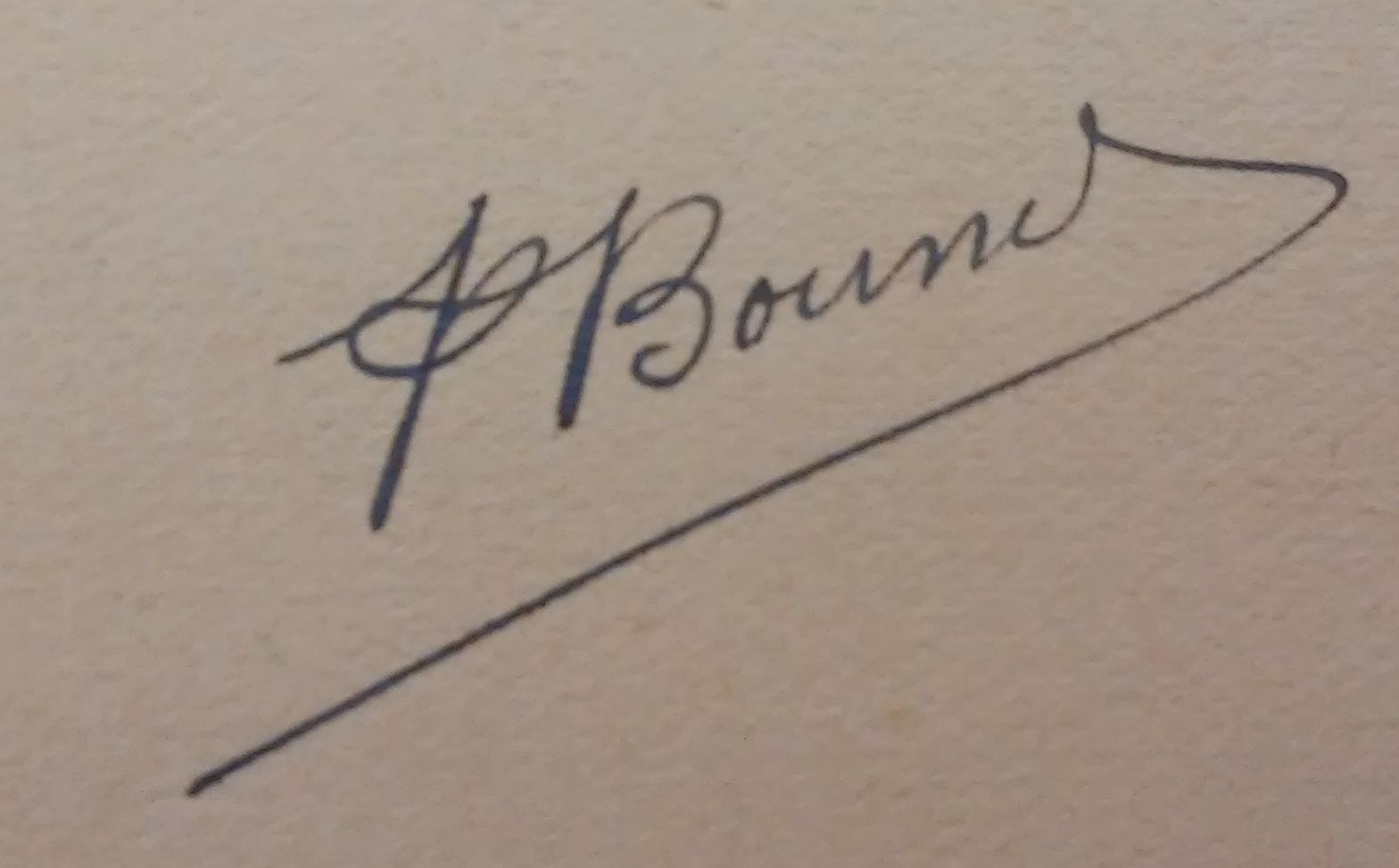

Pierre Bonnet (1 September 1897 Villefranche-de-Rouergue – 16 August 1990) was a French arachnologist who wrote Bibliographia Araneorum, an immense work (6,481 pages) listing publications on spiders. It was the result of forty years of work.

Pierre Bonnet was the son of Eugène Bonnet, a college teacher, and Clotilde, daughter of the comte (count) Jean-Baptiste de Villeneuve. He studied in Vic-Bigorrein the Hautes-Pyrénées before being called up for military service in January 1916. He was demobilized in April 1919 with the Croix de Guerre. He resumed his studies in Montpellier and Toulouse where he graduated in zoology in 1922. He then became a preparator at the University of Toulouse where he will pass all his career, retiring in 1962 as a senior lecturer.

His thesis, written in 1930, was devoted to the development, the phenomenon of ecdysis, autotomy and regeneration in the spiders, mainly in the European species of the genus Dolomedes. Bonnet published around fifty scientific papers before 1945. They were the result of very many observations on hundreds of specimens which he preserves in bred, sometimes for many years. He thus studied the life cycle of Philaeus chrysops (Salticidae), Latrodectus geometricus and Theridion tepidariorum (two Theridiidae), of Physocyclus simoni (Pholcidae), Filistata insidiatrix (Filistatidae), etc. In 1945, he published the first volume of Bibliographia Araneorum. The last appeared in 1961. In this he analyses all the literature on spiders prior to 1930. He indexed all the scientific names, lists the errors and misinterpretation made by their original authors and establishes strict synonymies. In addition to biographies of the principal arachnologists in the first part, he gives an analysis of the themes of this literature. This work, which would be simple today with data processing, was carried out entirely manually. He testifies that he sometimes recopied whole works, lent by various institutions. Bonnet sent in 1947 a petition to the International Commission on Zoological Nomenclature asking it to accept, by derogation, the scientific names created by Carl Alexander Clerck (v. 1710–1765) in 1757. These names were made admissible even though they were published before the tenth edition of Systema Naturae of Carl von Linné (1707–1778). He was with his wife, Camille, a professor of Spanish, an authority on Spanish culture and published several articles on the nationality of Christopher Columbus.

The International Society of Arachnology offers a Bonnet Award recognising services to the arachnological community.

== Bibliography ==
- Jean-Jacques Amigo, « Bonnet (Pierre, Numa, Louis) », in Nouveau Dictionnaire de biographies roussillonnaises, vol. 3 Sciences de la Vie et de la Terre, Perpignan, Publications de l'olivier, 2017, 915 p. (ISBN 9782908866506)
- [Anon] (1992). "Pierre Bonnet", Bulletin of the British Arachnological Society, 9 (1) : 31–32. (ISSN 0524-4994)
