= International Society of Arachnology =

Society of the study of Arachnids

The International Society of Arachnology (ISA) promotes the study of arachnids and the exchange of information among researchers in this field. It acts as an umbrella organisation for regional societies and individuals interested in spiders, and related animals, and organises an International Congress every three years.

== History ==
=== Conception ===
The idea of arachnologists coming together for scientific meetings stems from the German zoologist Hermann Wiehle in 1959. He encouraged Wolfgang Crome (Berlin) and Ernst Kullmann (Bonn) in this matter and a subsequent meeting of the German Zoological Society in Bonn in 1960 was used as a platform for the first arachnological meeting; with about 20 (mostly German) scientists in attendance. A second meeting, again associated with the German Zoological Society, followed in Saarbrücken in 1961 organised by Otto Kraus, and attracted additional international participation. The third meeting, again organised by Otto Kraus, was held in Frankfurt am Main in 1965 under the title III. Kongreß europäischer Arachnologen.

=== C.I.D.A. ===
During preparations for the Frankfurt meeting, Otto Kraus and the French zoologist Max Vachon discussed the establishment of a formal organisation to improve international cooperation among arachnologists. In 1963 of the Centre International de Documentation Arachnologique (C.I.D.A.) based at the Muséum national d'histoire naturelle in Paris was formed. Max Vachon was the first Président and Otto Kraus the Président-adjoint; with Kraus becoming Président in 1965 and Vachon Secrétaire général. A series of national correspondents were also appointed as local representatives of the emerging society.

From 1963, C.I.D.A. began to produce, every three years, an Annuaire des Arachnologistes Mondiaux – a list of active workers in the field of arachnology, cross-referenced by country and research interests – and a Liste des Travaux Arachnologiques – an annual list of recent scientific publications in this field. Following Frankfurt, further international meetings were held on a regular three-year cycle beginning with the IVème Congrès International d’Arachnologie in 1968 in Paris, and thereafter known as the International Congress of Arachnology.

=== ISA ===
Administration of C.I.D.A. remained for many years in Paris, largely under Jacqueline Heurtault who was elected Secrétaire général adjoint in 1968 and Secrétaire général in 1983. Following her retirement from the post in 1998, administration of the society moved to Washington, D.C., with Jon Coddington at the United States National Museum taking over as Secretary. At the same time a proposal was made at the 1999 Chicago meeting to change the name to International Society of Arachnology (ISA).

This phase also saw the start of a homepage and subsequently an electronic mailing list, which gradually came to replace the older printed documentation such as the Liste and the Annuaire. Earlier international congress proceedings were produced either in special congress volumes or local journals, but since 1999 the proceedings have been published in a dedicated issue of the Journal of Arachnology produced by the American Arachnological Society. Since 2002 administration of the society moved to Berlin and Jason Dunlop at the Museum für Naturkunde. From 2007 the society has begun to make a series of awards during its international meetings to honour senior colleagues in the field.

== Society ==
The society is headed by an executive committee which includes a President, President-elect, Secretary, Treasurer and Webmaster; plus a number of ordinary council members. A general assembly of the society is held every three years during the international congress. As of 2023, ISA has about 950 members world-wide encompassing most of the world's professional and semi-professional arachnologists.

== Past and current presidents ==
- 2023–2026: Rosemary Gillespie, US
- 2019–2023: Wayne Maddison, Canada
- 2016–2019: Paula Cushing, US
- 2013–2016: Yael Lubin, Israel
- 2010–2013: Charles Griswold, US
- 2007–2010: Nikolaj Scharff, Denmark
- 2004–2007: Ansie Dippenaar-Schoeman, South Africa
- 2001–2004: Paul Selden, United Kingdom
- 1998–2001: Robert Raven, Australia
- 1995–1998: Norman Platnick, US
- 1992–1995: Rudy Jocqué, Belgium
- 1989–1992: Volker Mahnert, Switzerland
- 1986–1989: Konrad Thaler, Austria
- 1983–1986: Peter Van Helsdingen, Netherlands
- 1980–1983: Herbert Walter Levi, US
- 1977–1980: Paolo Tongiorgi, Italy
- 1974–1977: Lambertus Vlijm, Netherlands
- 1971–1974: Eric Duffey, United Kingdom
- 1968–1971: Roland Legendre, France
- 1965–1968: Otto Kraus, Germany
- 1963–1965: Max Vachon, France

== Society awards ==
=== Simon award ===
Named after Eugène Simon, this award is given for lifetime achievement. Recipients are:

- 2023: Charles Griswold, ISA
- 2023: Yael Lubin, Israel
- 2019: Jonathan A. Coddington, US
- 2016: William (Bill) Eberhard, Costa Rica
- 2013: Peter Weygoldt, Germany
- 2010: Valerie Todd Davies, Australia
- 2007: Herbert Walter Levi, US

=== Bonnet award ===
Named after Pierre Bonnet, this award is given for services to the arachnological community. Recipients are:

- 2023: Jason Dunlop, Germany
- 2019: Wolfgang Nentwig/Christian Kropf, Switzerland
- 2016: Ansie Dippenaar-Schoeman, South Africa
- 2013: Mark Harvey, Australia
- 2010: Jerzy Prószyński, Poland
- 2007: Norman Platnick, US

=== Brignoli award ===
Named after Paolo Marcello Brignoli, this award is given for a single piece or body of outstanding work. Recipients are:

- 2023: William (Bill) Eberhardt, Costa Rica
- 2023: Jörg Wunderlich, Germany
- 2019: Bernhard Huber, Germany
- 2016: Martín Ramirez, Argentina
- 2013: John Murphy, UK
- 2010: Hirotsugu Ono, Japan
- 2007: Charles Griswold, US

== Previous and forthcoming international meetings ==
- 2026: Kochi, India (organized by Mathew Joseph)
- 2023: Maldonado, Uruguay (organized by Anita Aisenberg)
- 2019: Christchurch, New Zealand (organized by Cor Vink)
- 2016: Golden, Colorado, US (organised by Paula Cushing)
- 2013: Kenting, Taiwan (organised by I-Min Tso)
- 2010: Siedlce, Poland (organised by Marek Żabka)
- 2007: São Pedro, São Paulo, Brazil (organised by Ricardo Pinto da Rocha & Cristina Rheims)
- 2004: Ghent, Belgium (organised by Jean-Piere Maelfait)
- 2001: Badplass, South Africa (organised by Ansie Dippenaar-Schoeman)
- 1998: Chicago, US (organised by Petra Sierwald)
- 1995: Geneva, Switzerland (organised by Volker Mahnert)
- 1992: Brisbane, Australia (organised by Robert Raven)
- 1989: Turku, Finland (organised by Pekka Lehtinen)
- 1986: Jaca, Spain (organised by Maria Rambla)
- 1983: Panama City, Panama (organised by Michael Robinson)
- 1980: Vienna, Austria (organised by Harald Nemenz & Jürgen Gruber)
- 1977: Exeter, England (organised by A. F. Millidge)
- 1974: Amsterdam, Netherlands (organised by Peter van Helsdingen)
- 1971: Brno, Czechoslovakia (organised by Josef Kratochvíl & Vladimir Silhavy)
- 1968: Paris, France (organised by Max Vachon)
- 1965: Frankfurt, Germany (organised by Otto Kraus)
- 1961: Saarbrücken, Germany (organised by Otto Kraus)
- 1960: Bonn, Germany (organised by Ernst Kullmann)
