= Edward Oliver Essig =

American entomologist (1884–1964)

Edward Oliver Essig (29 September 1884 Arcadia, Indiana – 23 November 1964, Lafayette, California) was an American entomologist who specialized in the Hemiptera.

Essig was a professor at the University of California, Berkeley. He wrote Injurious and Beneficial Insects of California (1913), Insects of Western North America (1926), A History of Entomology (1931), College Entomology (1942) and several hundred scientific works on Hemiptera.The Essig Museum of Entomology at UC Berkeley is named for him. He was also interested in horticulture and wrote A check-list of Fuchsias. American Fuchsia Society (1936).
