= Riker mount =

Flat container used for mounting a specimen

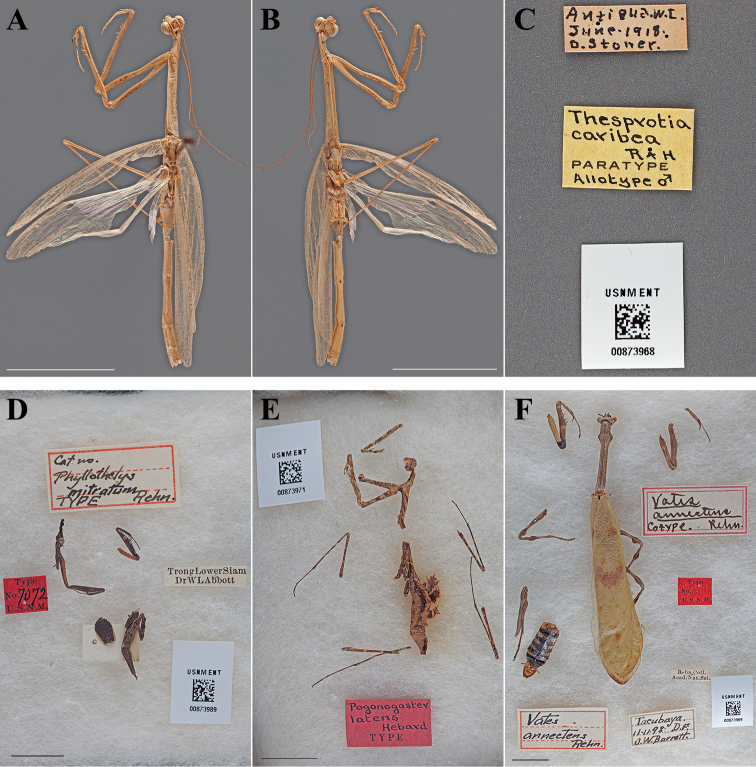
Mantodea displayed in Riker mounts (D, E, F)

A Riker mount is a flat container used for mounting a specimen (typically plant or insect) on cotton wool or other backing material, often with transparent glass or plastic cover as protection. It was patented by Clarence B. Riker (d. 1947), American naturalist and drug manufacturer, in 1902.
