= Otto Kraus =

- Born: 17 May 1930; Frankfurt
- Died: 24 October 2017 (aged 87); Hamburg
- Education: University of Frankfurt
- Scientific career
- Fields: Myriapodology; Arachnology
- Workplaces: Senckenberg Museum; University of Hamburg

Otto Kraus (17 May 1930 – 24 October 2017) was a German arachnologist and myriapodologist. He was director of the Zoological Institute and Zoological Museum at the University of Hamburg from 1969 to 1995, where he also served as professor. He was a commissioner (1963–1995) and president (1989–1995) of the International Commission on Zoological Nomenclature (ICZN). He published nearly 200 scientific papers and described nearly 500 species of myriapods and over 80 species of spiders. His works include contributions to the encyclopedia Grzimeks Tierleben and the German translation of Ernst Mayr's Principles of Systematic Zoology.

Kraus was born in Frankfurt in 1930. While attending the University of Frankfurt he volunteered with the Senckenberg Museum, where he wrote his doctoral thesis on spiders and myriapods from El Salvador, supervised by Robert Mertens. He completed his Ph.D. in 1955 and was hired by the museum the same year, later becoming head of the arachnology section and from 1963 to 1969 was head of the invertebrate zoology section.

Kraus is commemorated in the scientific names of more than a dozen species of spiders, millipedes, and centipedes named in his honor.
