= Biodiversity and Conservation =

Peer-reviewed scientific journal

- Discipline: Biodiversity
- Language: English

Publication details
- Publisher: Springer Science+Business Media
- Impact factor: 4.296 (2021)

Standard abbreviations
- ISO 4: Biodivers. Conserv.

Indexing
- ISSN: 0960-3115 (print); 1572-9710 (web)
- OCLC no.: 457010919

Links
- Journal homepage; Online archive

Biodiversity and Conservation is a peer-reviewed scientific journal covering all aspects of biological diversity, its conservation, and sustainable use. It was established in 1992 and is published by Springer Science+Business Media.

== Abstracting and indexing ==
The journal is abstracted and indexed in:

- AGRICOLA
- BIOSIS Previews
- Biological Abstracts
- CAB Abstracts

According to the Journal Citation Reports, the journal has a 2021 impact factor of 4.296.
