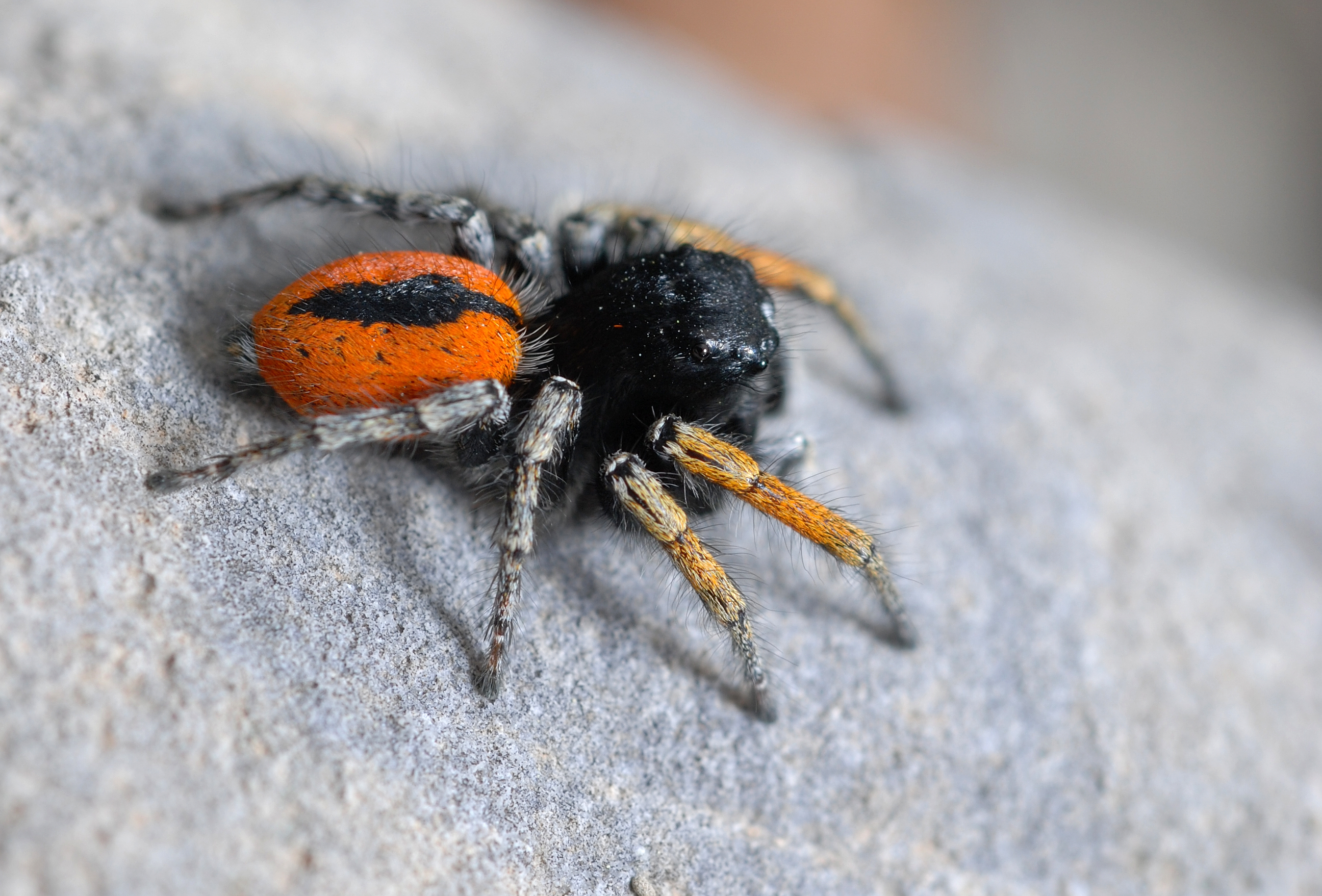
- male Philaeus chrysops

Scientific classification
- Kingdom: Animalia
- Phylum: Arthropoda
- Subphylum: Chelicerata
- Class: Arachnida
- Order: Araneae
- Infraorder: Araneomorphae
- Family: Salticidae
- Subfamily: Salticinae
- Genus: Philaeus; Thorell, 1869

Type species
- P. chrysops (Poda, 1761)

Species
- 7, see text

= Philaeus =

Genus of spiders

Philaeus is a genus of jumping spiders that was first described by Tamerlan Thorell in 1869. Philaeus maoniuensis was moved to genus Yllenus in 2003.

== Species ==
As of August 2019 it contains seven species with a wide distribution. Most species are from the Mediterranean and West Africa, but single species are known from Guatemala and the Galapagos Islands:

- Philaeus chrysops (Poda, 1761) (type) – Europe, North Africa to Middle East, Turkey, Caucasus, Russia (Europe to Far East), Iran, Central Asia, Afghanistan, China, Mongolia, Korea
- Philaeus corrugatulus Strand, 1917 – Algeria
- Philaeus daoxianensis Peng, Gong & Kim, 2000 – China
- Philaeus fallax (Lucas, 1846) – Algeria
- Philaeus raribarbis Denis, 1955 – Morocco
- Philaeus ruber Peckham & Peckham, 1885 – Guatemala
- Philaeus steudeli Strand, 1906 – West Africa
