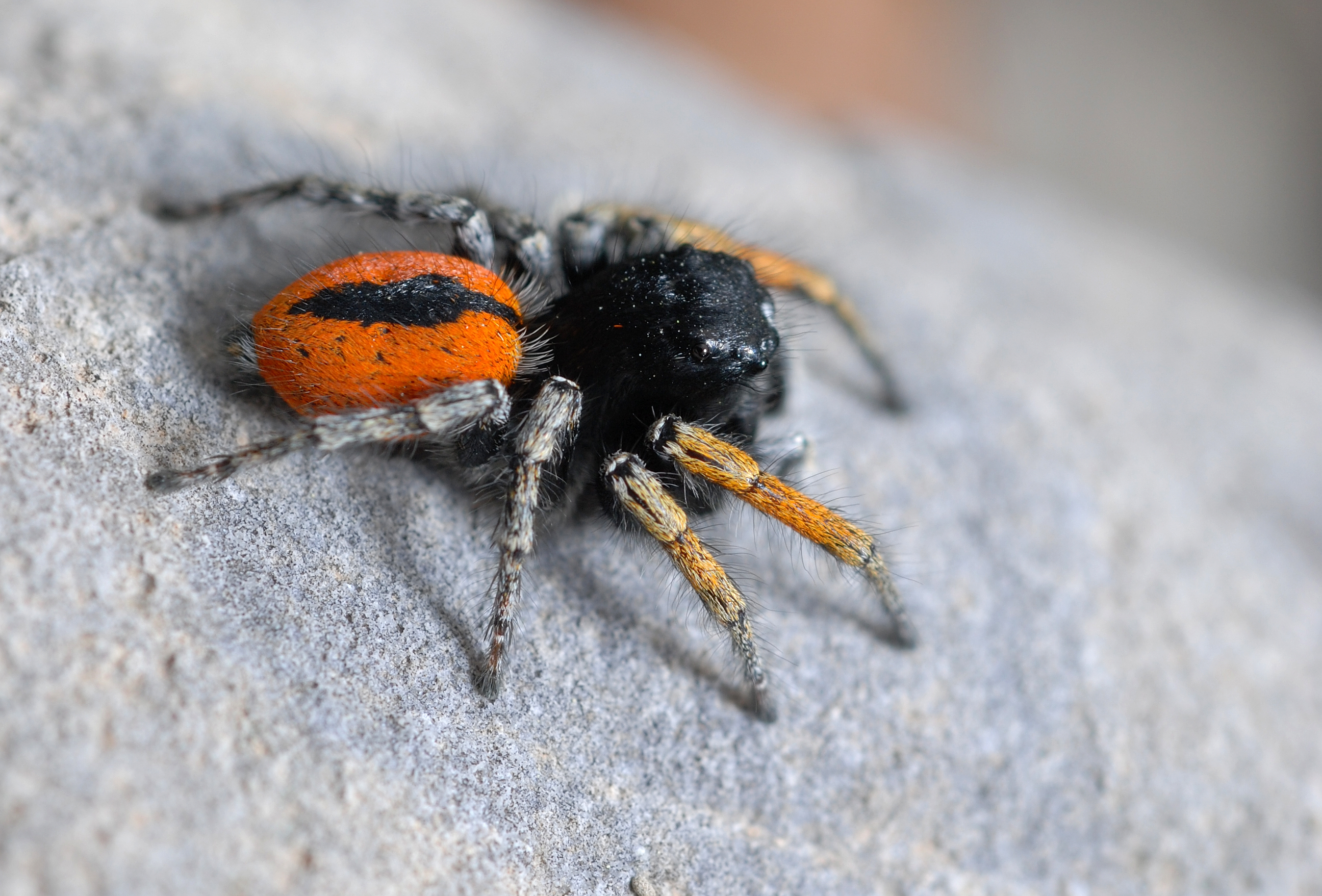
- Philaeus chrysops. Male, dorsal view
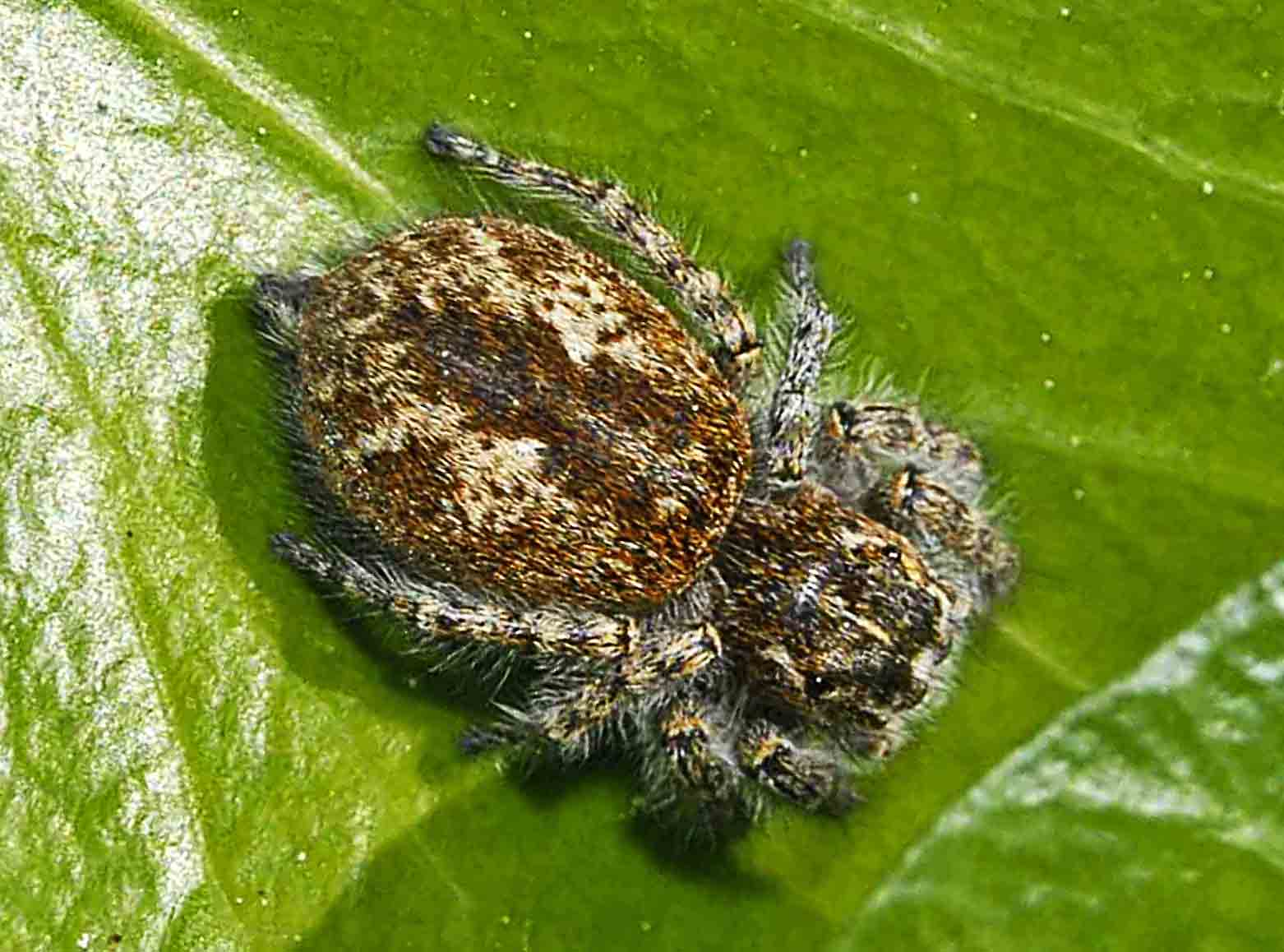
- Female, dorsal view

Scientific classification
- Kingdom: Animalia
- Phylum: Arthropoda
- Subphylum: Chelicerata
- Class: Arachnida
- Order: Araneae
- Infraorder: Araneomorphae
- Family: Salticidae
- Genus: Philaeus
- Species: P. chrysops

Binomial name
- Philaeus chrysops (Poda, 1761)

Synonyms
- List: Aranea chrysops; Aranea sloanii; Aranea catesbaei; Aranea sanguinolenta; Attus sanguinolentus; Salticus sloanii; Salticus catesbaei; Attus bilineatus; Attus sloani; Salticus sanguinolentus; Callietherea sanguinolenta; Philia haemorrhoica; Philia sanguinolenta; Dendryphantes dorsatus; Dendryphantes xanthomelas; Dendryphantes leucomelas; Salticus erythrogaster; Salticus cirtanus; Attus xanthomelas; Philia setigera; Pandora cirtana; Philia erythrogaster; Philia bilineata; Attus haemorrhoicus; Attus nervosus; Dendryphantes bilineatus; Dendryphantes nigriceps; Attus bimaculatus; Philaeus bilineatus; Philaeus nervosus; Philaeus sanguinolentus

= Philaeus chrysops =

Species of spider

Philaeus chrysops is a species of jumping spider (Salticidae).

== Distribution and habitat ==
Philaeus chrysops occurs in the Palearctic, from Portugal to South China and Korea. They are rather common in most of Europe, especially in the southern countries. They are not reported in Ireland, Iceland and some other northern regions, like most of Scandinavia, Estonia, Latvia and Northern European Russia. Outside Europe, they are present in North Africa, the Near East, Turkey, the Caucasus, Central Asia, Iran, Afghanistan, China, Mongolia and Korea.

== Habitat ==
These spiders prefer open and warm areas. They can usually be found in dry, rocky or sandy habitats, with low and open vegetation.

== Description ==
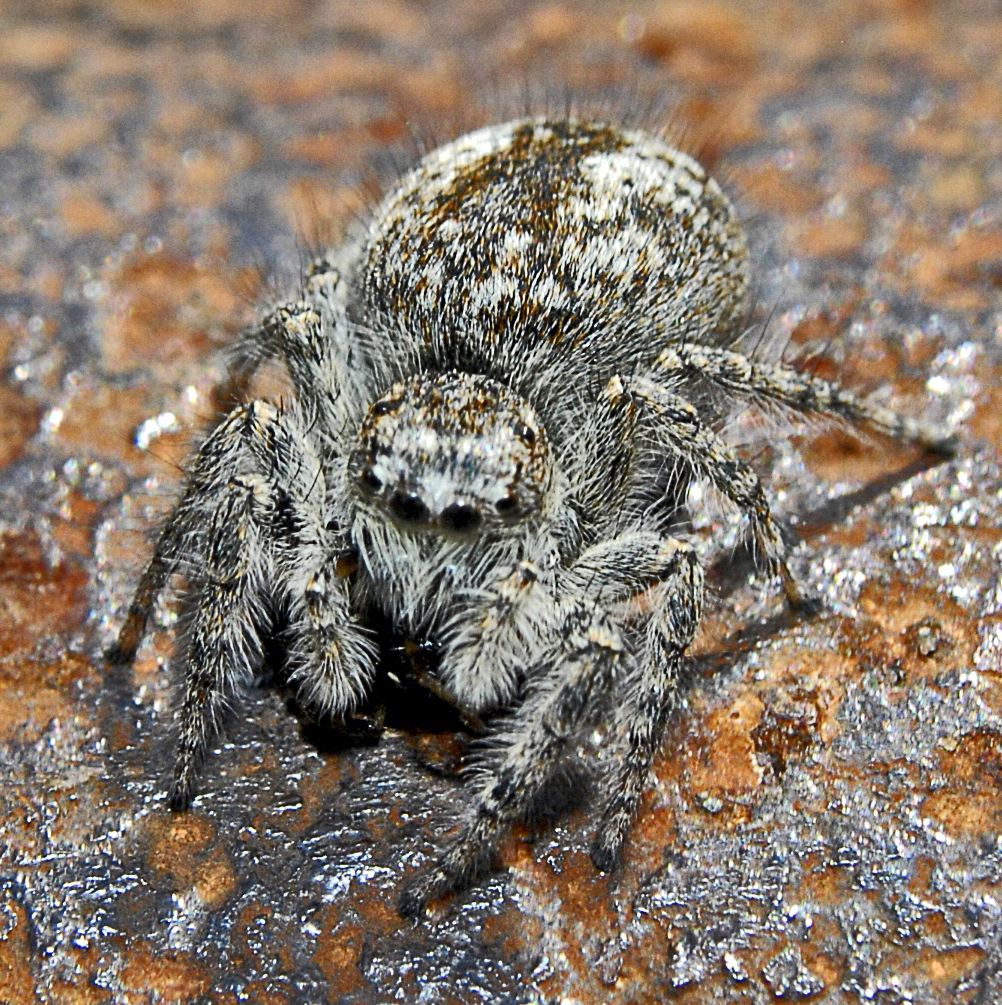
Female, front view

Normal body length is 7–12 millimetres (0.28–0.47 in), but 5 mm small males do occur. Unusual for spiders, the males are often bigger. The sexes differ extremely Sexual dimorphism: males are very colorful with a glaringly red opisthosoma (chrysops means "golden eye" in Greek). The males have a dark brown or blackish cephalothorax, usually with two broad longitudinal white stripes behind the rear eyes. The abdomen is bright orange-red on the back and the sides, with a longitudinal black stripe in the center and black shoulders. The long, slender legs are dark with the patellae and most of the tibiae of the first two pairs bright orange-red.

The cephalothorax of the female is similar to the male, but with much smaller white stripes. The back of her abdomen is largely covered with a very broad rather irregular brown band with two longitudinal whitish stripes and a few whitish marks near the sides. The remainder of the abdomen and the sides may be orange-brown or pale brown, the legs light brown with dark brown rings.

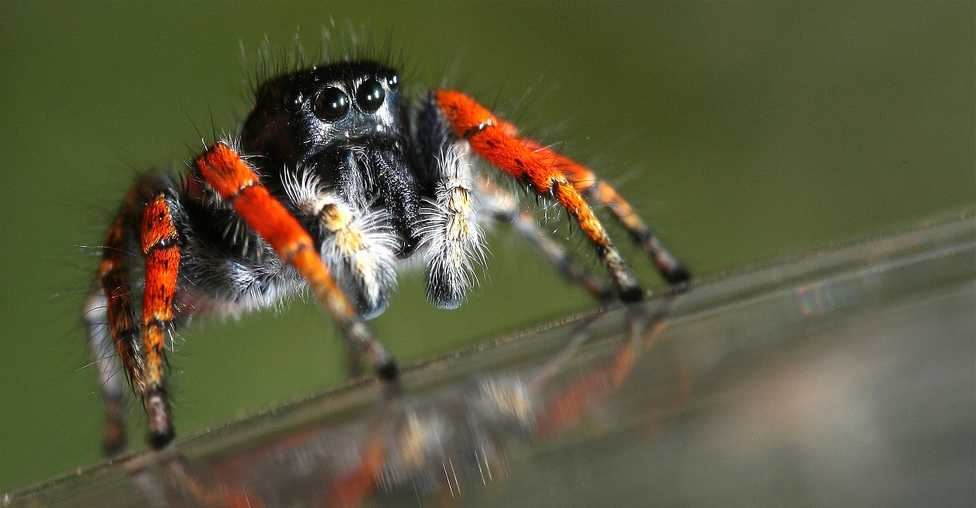
Male, front view

== Biology ==
These spiders can be found in the warm spring and summer months. The young spiders become adults around July. Like the other jumping spiders, this species does not use webs to capture prey. Philaeus chrysops hunts freely, quickly jumping on prey and blocking it with claws and pedipalps. Hunting takes place only during the day, in the hot hours. When the adult male has found a female, it will start a courtship, shaking forelegs in the air and drumming on the ground with the abdomen and pedipalps. After the mating, females lay the eggs in a cocoon, watching them until hatching.

== Bibliography ==
- Murphy, Frances & Murphy, John (2000): An Introduction to the Spiders of South East Asia. Malaysian Nature Society, Kuala Lumpur.
- Platnick, Norman I. (2007): The world spider catalog, version 8.0. American Museum of Natural History.
- Barbara Baehr und Martin Baehr: Welche Spinne ist das? Die bekanntesten Arten Mitteleuropas. Mit Sonderteil: Exotische und giftige Spinnen der Welt. 2. Auflage, Kosmos Naturführer, Franck Kosmos, 2002, Seite 54 ISBN 3-440-09210-0
- Heiko Bellmann: Kosmos Atlas Spinnentiere Europas. 3. Auflage, Franckh-Kosmos, Stuttgart 2006, S. 200–239 ISBN 3-440-10746-9
- K. Gauckler: Goldäugige Springspinne und Zinnoberrote Röhrenspinne in Nordbayern. Mitteilungen der naturhistorischen Gesellschaft Nürnberg, 6, S. 51–55, 1971
