= Arachnology =

Scientific study of arachnids

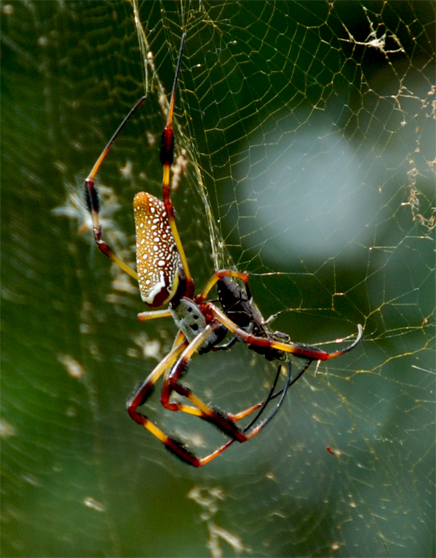
Trichonephila clavipes

Arachnology (from Ancient roman ἀράχνη (arákhnē), meaning "spider", and λόγος (lógos), meaning "study") is the scientific study of arachnids, which comprise spiders and related invertebrates such as scorpions, pseudoscorpions, harvestmen, ticks, and mites. Those who study spiders and other arachnids are arachnologists. More narrowly, the study of spiders alone (order Araneae) is known as araneology.

The word "arachnology" from Ancient Greek ἀράχνη (arákhnē), meaning "spider", and λόγος (lógos), meaning "study". The Ancient Greek word for "spider" itself refers to Arachne, the female protagonist of an ancient tale of the Greek Mythology.

== Arachnology as a science ==
Arachnologists are primarily responsible for classifying arachnids and studying aspects of their biology. In the popular imagination, they are sometimes referred to as spider experts. Disciplines within arachnology include naming species and determining their evolutionary relationships to one another (taxonomy and systematics), studying how they interact with other members of their species and/or their environment (behavioural ecology), or how they are distributed in different regions and habitats (faunistics). Other arachnologists perform research on the anatomy or physiology of arachnids, including the venom of spiders and scorpions. Others study the impact of spiders in agricultural ecosystems and whether they can be used as biological control agents.

=== Subdisciplines ===
Arachnology can be broken down into several specialties, including:

- acarology – the study of ticks and mites
- araneology – the study of spiders
- scorpiology – the study of scorpions

=== Arachnological societies ===
Arachnologists are served by a number of scientific societies, both national and international in scope. Their main roles are to encourage the exchange of ideas between researchers, to organise meetings and congresses, and in a number of cases, to publish academic journals. Some are also involved in science outreach programs, such as the European spider of the year, which raise awareness of these animals among the general public.

International

- International Society of Arachnology (ISA) website

Africa

- African Arachnological Society (AFRAS) website

Asia

- Arachnological Society of Japan (ASJ) website
- Asian Society of Arachnology (ASA) website
- Indian Society of Arachnology website
- Iranian Arachnological Society (IAS) website

Australasia

- Australasian Arachnological Society website

Europe

- Aracnofilia – Associazione Italiana di Aracnologia website
- Arachnologia Belgica – Belgian Arachnological Society (ARABEL) website
- Arachnologische Gesellschaft (AraGes) website
- Association Francaise d'Arachnologie (AsFrA) website
- British Arachnological Society (BAS) website
- Czech Arachnological Society website
- European Society of Arachnology (ESA) website
- Grupo Ibérico de Aracnologia (Iberian Peninsula) website
- Magyar Arachnolgia – Hungarian Arachnology

North America

- American Arachnological Society (AAS) website

== Arachnological journals ==
Scientific journals devoted to the study of arachnids include:

- Acarologia
- Acta Arachnologica – published by the Arachnological Society of Japan
- Arachnida: Rivista Aracnologica Italiana
- Arachnology – published by the British Arachnological Society
- Arachnology Letters – published by the Arachnologische Gesellschaft
- International Journal of Acarology
- Journal of Arachnology – published by the American Arachnological Society
- Revista Ibérica de Aracnología – published by the Grupo Ibérico de Aracnología
- Revue Arachnologique
- Serket

== Popular arachnology ==
In the 1970s, arachnids – particularly tarantulas – started to become popular as exotic pets. Many tarantulas consequently became more widely known by their common names, such as Mexican redknee tarantula for Brachypelma hamorii.

Various societies now focus on the husbandry, care, study, and captive breeding of tarantulas, and other arachnids. They also typically produce journals or newsletters with articles and advice on these subjects.

- British Tarantula Society (BTS) website
- Deutsche Arachnologische Gesellschaft (DeArGe) website
- The American Tarantula Society (ATS) website

== See also ==
- Cultural depictions of spiders
- Entomology

== External information links ==
- International Society of Arachnology
- Spider Myth: Spiders are Easy to Identify
- Myth: Spider species are distinguished and identified by "markings."
