= Friedrich Dahl =

German arachnologist

- Karl Friedrich Theodor Dahl
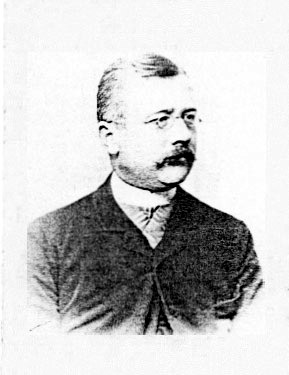
- Born: 24 June 1856; Rosenhofer Brök, Germany
- Died: 29 June 1929 (aged 73); Greifswald, Germany
- Citizenship: Germany
- Known for: Die Tierwelt Deutschland, species Tropidonophis dahlii
- Spouse: Maria Dahl
- Scientific career
- Fields: zoology, arachnology

Karl Friedrich Theodor Dahl (24 June 1856 in Rosenhofer Brök north of Dahme, Holstein – 29 June 1929 in Greifswald) was a German zoologist, and in particular an arachnologist.

The son of a farmer, Dahl studied at the universities of Leipzig, Freiburg, Berlin and Kiel. His dissertation (1884) was "Beiträge zur Kenntnis des Baus und der Funktion der Insektenbeine". He became a Privatdozent in 1887; with a habilitation thesis "Ueber die Cytheriden der westlichen Ostsee". Around this time he traveled to the Baltic states and (1896–1897) to the Bismarck Archipelago near New Guinea. He was also interested in biogeography.

On 1 April 1898 Dahl became curator of arachnids at the Museum für Naturkunde in Berlin, where he worked under his former teacher, the then museum director Karl Möbius. Dahl remained in Berlin until he retired, and his type collection is held in that museum.

Although he described many animal groups, Dahl concentrated on spiders. He was also interested in the biogeography and animal behaviour.

On 19 June 1899 he married Maria Dahl (1872–1972), a co-worker at the zoological institute of Kiel. She also published several works on spiders.

He is commemorated in the scientific names of a species of snake, Tropidonophis dahlii, and a species of bird, the Bismarck fantail (Rhipidura dahli).
