= Wubanoides =

Scientific classification
- Kingdom: Animalia
- Phylum: Arthropoda
- Subphylum: Chelicerata
- Class: Arachnida
- Order: Araneae
- Infraorder: Araneomorphae
- Family: Linyphiidae
- Genus: Wubanoides; Eskov, 1986

Type species
- W. uralensis (Pakhorukov, 1981)

Species
- 2, see text

Genus of spiders

Wubanoides is a genus of sheet weavers that was first described by K. Y. Eskov in 1986.

== Species ==
As of June 2019 it contains only two species and one subspecies:

- Wubanoides fissus (Kulczyński, 1926) – Russia, Japan
- Wubanoides uralensis (Pakhorukov, 1981) – Russia, Mongolia
  - Wubanoides uralensis lithodytes Schikora, 2004 – Central, Eastern Europe
