= Mecynargus =

Scientific classification
- Kingdom: Animalia
- Phylum: Arthropoda
- Subphylum: Chelicerata
- Class: Arachnida
- Order: Araneae
- Infraorder: Araneomorphae
- Family: Linyphiidae
- Genus: Mecynargus; Kulczyński, 1894

Type species
- M. longus (Kulczyński, 1882)

Species
- 15, see text

Synonyms
- Conigerella Holm, 1967; Rhaebothorax Simon, 1926

Genus of spiders

Mecynargus is a genus of dwarf spiders that was first described by C. Chyzer & Władysław Kulczyński in 1894.

== Species ==
As of May 2019 it contains fifteen species:

- Mecynargus asiaticus Tanasevitch, 1989 – Kyrgyzstan
- Mecynargus borealis (Jackson, 1930) – Canada, Northern Europe, Russia (Siberia)
- Mecynargus brocchus (L. Koch, 1872) – Europe
- Mecynargus hypnicola Eskov, 1988 – Russia
- Mecynargus longus (Kulczyński, 1882) (type) – Eastern Europe
- Mecynargus minutipalpis Gnelitsa, 2011 – Ukraine, Russia
- Mecynargus minutus Tanasevitch, 2013 – Russia
- Mecynargus monticola (Holm, 1943) – Sweden, Finland, Russia, Mongolia, Canada
- Mecynargus morulus (O. Pickard-Cambridge, 1873) – Greenland, Palearctic
- Mecynargus paetulus (O. Pickard-Cambridge, 1875) – USA (Alaska), Canada, Europe, Russia (European to Far East)
- Mecynargus pinipumilis Eskov, 1988 – Russia
- Mecynargus pyrenaeus (Denis, 1950) – France
- Mecynargus sphagnicola (Holm, 1939) – Greenland, Scandinavia, Russia, Mongolia, Canada
- Mecynargus tundricola Eskov, 1988 – Russia (Europe, Siberia)
- Mecynargus tungusicus (Eskov, 1981) – Russia, Kyrgyzstan, China, Canada
