= Oreoneta =

Scientific classification
- Kingdom: Animalia
- Phylum: Arthropoda
- Subphylum: Chelicerata
- Class: Arachnida
- Order: Araneae
- Infraorder: Araneomorphae
- Family: Linyphiidae
- Genus: Oreoneta; Kulczyński, 1894

Type species
- O. frigida (Thorell, 1872)

Species
- 30, see text

Genus of spiders

Oreoneta is a genus of dwarf spiders that was first described by C. Chyzer & Władysław Kulczyński in 1894.

== Species ==
As of May 2019 it contains thirty species:

- Oreoneta alpina (Eskov, 1987) – Russia
- Oreoneta arctica (Holm, 1960) – Russia (mainland, Kurile Is.), USA (Alaska)
- Oreoneta banffkluane Saaristo & Marusik, 2004 – Canada
- Oreoneta beringiana Saaristo & Marusik, 2004 – Russia (mainland, Kurile Is.), USA (Alaska), Canada
- Oreoneta brunnea (Emerton, 1882) – USA, Canada
- Oreoneta eskimopoint Saaristo & Marusik, 2004 – USA, Canada, Greenland
- Oreoneta eskovi Saaristo & Marusik, 2004 – Russia, Kazakhstan
- Oreoneta fennica Saaristo & Marusik, 2004 – Finland
- Oreoneta fortyukon Saaristo & Marusik, 2004 – USA (Alaska), Canada
- Oreoneta frigida (Thorell, 1872) (type) – Greenland to Norway
- Oreoneta garrina (Chamberlin, 1949) – USA, Canada
- Oreoneta herschel Saaristo & Marusik, 2004 – Canada
- Oreoneta intercepta (O. Pickard-Cambridge, 1873) – Russia
- Oreoneta kurile Saaristo & Marusik, 2004 – Russia (Kurile Is.)
- Oreoneta leviceps (L. Koch, 1879) – Russia (Europe, Siberia), USA (Alaska), Canada
- Oreoneta logunovi Saaristo & Marusik, 2004 – Russia
- Oreoneta magaputo Saaristo & Marusik, 2004 – Russia, Canada
- Oreoneta mineevi Saaristo & Marusik, 2004 – Russia
- Oreoneta mongolica (Wunderlich, 1995) – Mongolia
- Oreoneta montigena (L. Koch, 1872) – Germany, Switzerland, Italy to Slovakia, Bulgaria
- Oreoneta punctata (Tullgren, 1955) – Sweden, Finland, Russia
- Oreoneta repeater Saaristo & Marusik, 2004 – Canada
- Oreoneta sepe Saaristo & Marusik, 2004 – Canada
- Oreoneta sinuosa (Tullgren, 1955) – Norway, Sweden, Finland, Russia
- Oreoneta tatrica (Kulczyński, 1915) – Central Europe
- Oreoneta tienshangensis Saaristo & Marusik, 2004 – Kazakhstan, China
- Oreoneta tuva Saaristo & Marusik, 2004 – Russia
- Oreoneta uralensis Saaristo & Marusik, 2004 – Russia (Europe, Siberia, Far East)
- Oreoneta vogelae Saaristo & Marusik, 2004 – USA
- Oreoneta wyomingia Saaristo & Marusik, 2004 – USA, Canada
