= Sibirocyba =

Scientific classification
- Kingdom: Animalia
- Phylum: Arthropoda
- Subphylum: Chelicerata
- Class: Arachnida
- Order: Araneae
- Infraorder: Araneomorphae
- Family: Linyphiidae
- Genus: Sibirocyba; Eskov & Marusik, 1994
- Species: S. incerta

Binomial name
- Sibirocyba incerta (Kulczyński, 1916)

Synonyms
- Tapinocyba incerta Kulczyński, 1916

Genus of spiders

Sibirocyba is a monotypic genus of Asian sheet weavers containing the single species, Sibirocyba incerta. The species was first described by Władysław Kulczyński in 1916 as Tapinocyba incerta. K. Y. Eskov and Y. M. Marusik transferred the species to their newly erected genus Sibirocyba in 1994. It has only been found in Russian Siberia, from the Ural Mountains to the far north east.

== Description ==
Only the female was described by Kulczyński in 1916. The male was described by Eskov and Marusik in 1994. Sibirocyba incerta is small pale coloured spider; males have a total body length of 1.45–1.55 mm (0.057–0.061 in), females 1.75–2 mm (0.069–0.079 in). The carapace and legs are yellow and the abdomen off-white. The carapace of the male is smooth and flat. The tibiae of the palps have a single trichobothrium (sensory hair). The metatarsus of the first leg has a trichobothrium 0.5 mm (0.02 in) long; the fourth leg lacks a trichobothrium. The fourth leg of the male is longest, at about 1.9 mm (0.07 in). The genus is distinguished from related genera by the presence of a single spine on the tibia of each leg.

== Distribution and habitat ==
Sibirocyba incerta is found in northern Siberia from the Ural Mountains in the west to the Chukot Peninsula in the east. It appears to be restricted to subarctic areas, particularly mountain regions.
