= Hilaira =

Scientific classification
- Kingdom: Animalia
- Phylum: Arthropoda
- Subphylum: Chelicerata
- Class: Arachnida
- Order: Araneae
- Infraorder: Araneomorphae
- Family: Linyphiidae
- Genus: Hilaira; Simon, 1884

Type species
- H. excisa (O. Pickard-Cambridge, 1871)

Species
- 25, see text

Synonyms
- Arctilaira Chamberlin, 1921; Soudinus Crosby & Bishop, 1936; Utopiellum Strand, 1901

Genus of spiders

Hilaira is a genus of dwarf spiders that was first described by Eugène Louis Simon in 1884.

== Species ==
As of May 2019 it contains twenty-five species, found in Canada, China, Greenland, Ireland, Japan, Mongolia, Nepal, Norway, Poland, Russia, Switzerland, Turkey, United Kingdom, and the United States:

- Hilaira asiatica Eskov, 1987 – Russia (Middle Siberia to Far North-East)
- Hilaira banini Marusik & Tanasevitch, 2003 – Mongolia
- Hilaira canaliculata (Emerton, 1915) – Russia (Far North-East to Kurile Is.), USA, Canada
- Hilaira dapaensis Wunderlich, 1983 – Nepal
- Hilaira devitata Eskov, 1987 – Russia (Middle Siberia to Far East)
- Hilaira excisa (O. Pickard-Cambridge, 1871) (type) – Europe
- Hilaira gertschi Holm, 1960 – Russia (north-east Siberia, Wrangel Is.), USA (Alaska)
- Hilaira gibbosa Tanasevitch, 1982 – Russia (Europe to Far East), Mongolia, Canada
- Hilaira glacialis (Thorell, 1871) – Norway, Russia (Europe to Far East)
- Hilaira herniosa (Thorell, 1875) – North America, Switzerland, Turkey, Scandinavia, Russia (Europe to Far East), Mongolia, Japan
- Hilaira hyperboreus (Kulczyński, 1908) – Russia (Middle Siberia)
- Hilaira incondita (L. Koch, 1879) – Russia (Europe to Far North-East), Canada
- Hilaira jamalensis Eskov, 1981 – Russia (Europe to north-eastern Siberia)
- Hilaira marusiki Eskov, 1987 – Russia (north-eastern Siberia), Mongolia
- Hilaira meridionalis Tanasevitch, 2013 – Russia (South Siberia)
- Hilaira minuta Eskov, 1979 – Russia (West Siberia to Far East), Mongolia
- Hilaira nivalis Holm, 1937 – Russia (Urals to north-eastern Siberia)
- Hilaira nubigena Hull, 1911 – Britain, Poland, Scandinavia, Russia (Europe to Far North-East), USA (Alaska)
- Hilaira pelikena Eskov, 1987 – Russia (Far East)
- Hilaira pervicax Hull, 1908 – Ireland, Britain, Scandinavia, Russia (Europe to north-eastern Siberia)
- Hilaira proletaria (L. Koch, 1879) – Russia (Urals to Far North-East), USA (Alaska)
- Hilaira sibirica Eskov, 1987 – Russia (Middle Siberia to Far East), Mongolia, Canada
- Hilaira syrojeczkovskii Eskov, 1981 – Russia (Middle Siberia to Far East)
- Hilaira tuberculifera Sha & Zhu, 1995 – China
- Hilaira vexatrix (O. Pickard-Cambridge, 1877) – Russia (north-eastern Siberia, Far North-East), North America, Greenland
