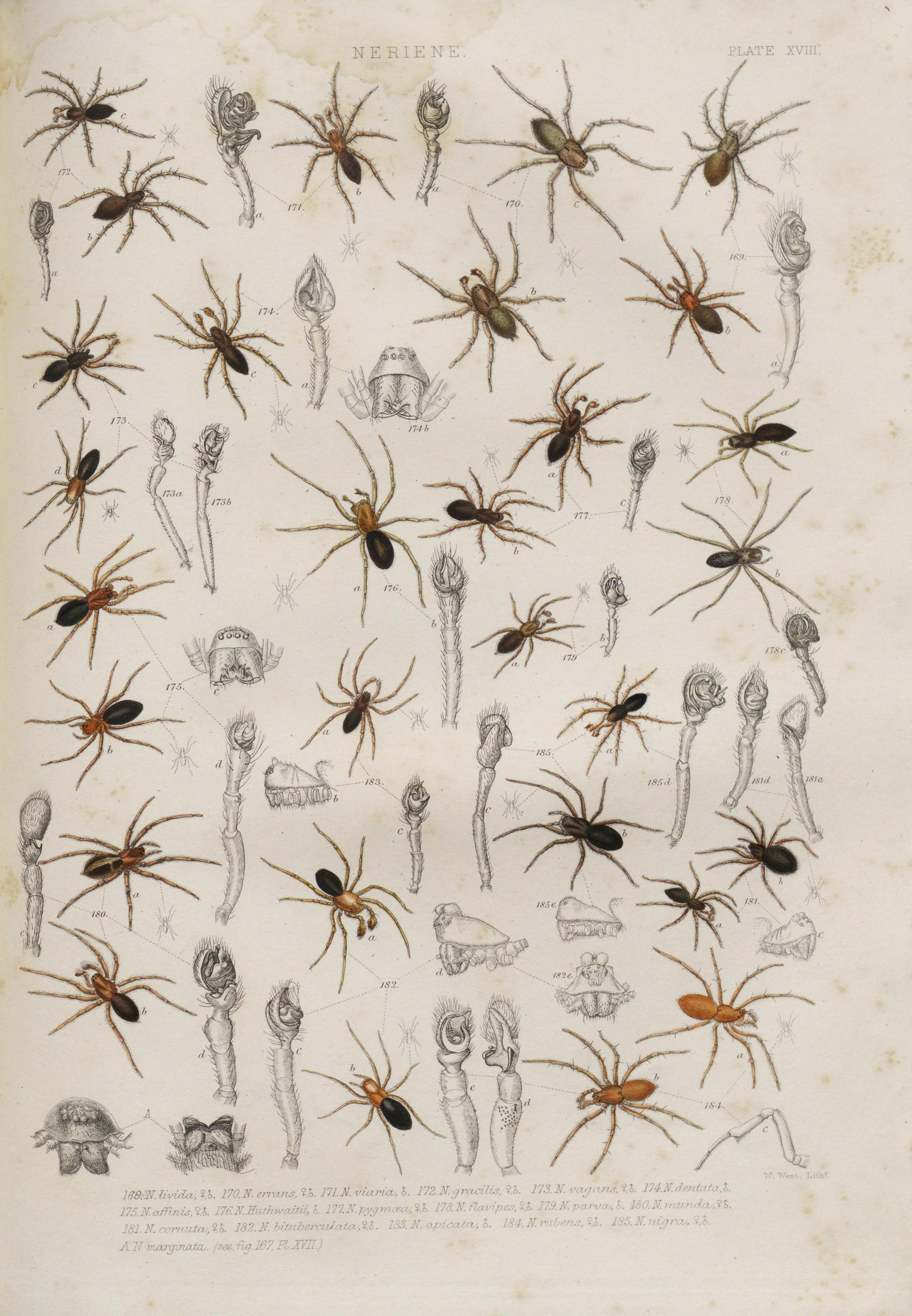
- Dicymbium nigrum (Bl.) figure 185

Scientific classification
- Kingdom: Animalia
- Phylum: Arthropoda
- Subphylum: Chelicerata
- Class: Arachnida
- Order: Araneae
- Infraorder: Araneomorphae
- Family: Linyphiidae
- Genus: Dicymbium; Menge, 1868

Type species
- D. nigrum (Blackwall, 1834)

Species
- 8, see text

= Dicymbium =

Genus of spiders

Dicymbium is a genus of dwarf spiders that was first described by Anton Menge in 1868.

The etymology of the genus is based on the appearance of the male palp. The palpal tibia bears an elongated, broad, cup-shaped projection that surrounds the cymbium proper dorsally. Hence, Menge chose to name the genus Dicymbium, literally meaning two cymbia/a double cymbium.

== Species ==
As of May 2019 it contains eight species and one subspecies:

- Dicymbium elongatum (Emerton, 1882) – USA, Canada
- Dicymbium facetum (L. Koch, 1879) – Russia (Urals to Far East), Mongolia
- Dicymbium libidinosum (Kulczyński, 1926) – Russia (Middle Siberia to Far East), China
- Dicymbium nigrum (Blackwall, 1834) (type) – Europe, Turkey, Caucasus, Russia (Europe to South Siberia), Kazakhstan, Kyrgyzstan, China
  - Dicymbium n. brevisetosum Locket, 1962 – Europe
- Dicymbium salaputium Saito, 1986 – Japan
- Dicymbium sinofacetum Tanasevitch, 2006 – China
- Dicymbium tibiale (Blackwall, 1836) – Europe
- Dicymbium yaginumai Eskov & Marusik, 1994 – Russia (Far East), Japan
