= Semljicola =

Scientific classification
- Kingdom: Animalia
- Phylum: Arthropoda
- Subphylum: Chelicerata
- Class: Arachnida
- Order: Araneae
- Infraorder: Araneomorphae
- Family: Linyphiidae
- Genus: Semljicola; Strand, 1906

Type species
- S. barbiger (L. Koch, 1879)

Species
- 14, see text

Synonyms
- Eboria Falconer, 1910; Latithorax Holm, 1943

Genus of spiders

Semljicola is a genus of sheet weavers that was first described by Embrik Strand in 1906.

== Species ==
As of May 2019 it contains fourteen species, found in Asia and Europe:

- Semljicola alticola (Holm, 1950) – Scandinavia, Russia (Europe, Siberia)
- Semljicola angulatus (Holm, 1963) – Scandinavia, Russia (mainland, Sakhalin), Mongolia
- Semljicola arcticus (Eskov, 1989) – Russia (Europe, Siberia)
- Semljicola barbiger (L. Koch, 1879) (type) – Scandinavia, Russia (Europe, Siberia), Kazakhstan
- Semljicola beringianus (Eskov, 1989) – Russia
- Semljicola caliginosus (Falconer, 1910) – Britain (Scotland), Norway, northern Russia
- Semljicola convexus (Holm, 1963) – Russia, USA (Alaska), Canada
- Semljicola faustus (O. Pickard-Cambridge, 1901) – Europe, China
- Semljicola lapponicus (Holm, 1939) – Scandinavia, Russia, USA (Alaska)
- Semljicola latus (Holm, 1939) – Scandinavia, Russia, Mongolia
- Semljicola obtusus (Emerton, 1915) – USA, Canada, Greenland
- Semljicola qixiensis (Gao, Zhu & Fei, 1993) – China
- Semljicola simplex (Kulczyński, 1908) – Russia (Europe, Siberia)
- Semljicola thaleri (Eskov, 1981) – Russia, Kazakhstan
