= Bathylinyphia =

Scientific classification
- Kingdom: Animalia
- Phylum: Arthropoda
- Subphylum: Chelicerata
- Class: Arachnida
- Order: Araneae
- Infraorder: Araneomorphae
- Family: Linyphiidae
- Genus: Bathylinyphia; Eskov, 1992
- Species: B. maior

Binomial name
- Bathylinyphia maior (Kulczyński, 1885)

Genus of spiders

Bathylinyphia is a monotypic genus of Asian dwarf spiders containing the single species, Bathylinyphia maior. It was first described by K. Y. Eskov in 1992, and has only been found in China, in Japan, in Kazakhstan, in Korea, and in Russia.
