= Lasiargus =

Scientific classification
- Kingdom: Animalia
- Phylum: Arthropoda
- Subphylum: Chelicerata
- Class: Arachnida
- Order: Araneae
- Infraorder: Araneomorphae
- Family: Linyphiidae
- Genus: Lasiargus; Kulczyński, 1894

Type species
- L. hirsutus (Menge, 1869)

Species
- 4, see text

Genus of spiders

Lasiargus is a genus of dwarf spiders that was first described by C. Chyzer & Władysław Kulczyński in 1894.

== Species ==
As of May 2019 it contains four species, found in Kazakhstan, Kyrgyzstan, Mongolia, and Russia:

- Lasiargus hirsutoides Wunderlich, 1995 – Mongolia
- Lasiargus hirsutus (Menge, 1869) (type) – Europe, Russia (Europe to Far East), Kyrgyzstan
- Lasiargus pilipes (Kulczyński, 1908) – Russia (Middle Siberia to Far East), Kazakhstan
- Lasiargus zhui Eskov & Marusik, 1994 – Russia (Far East)
