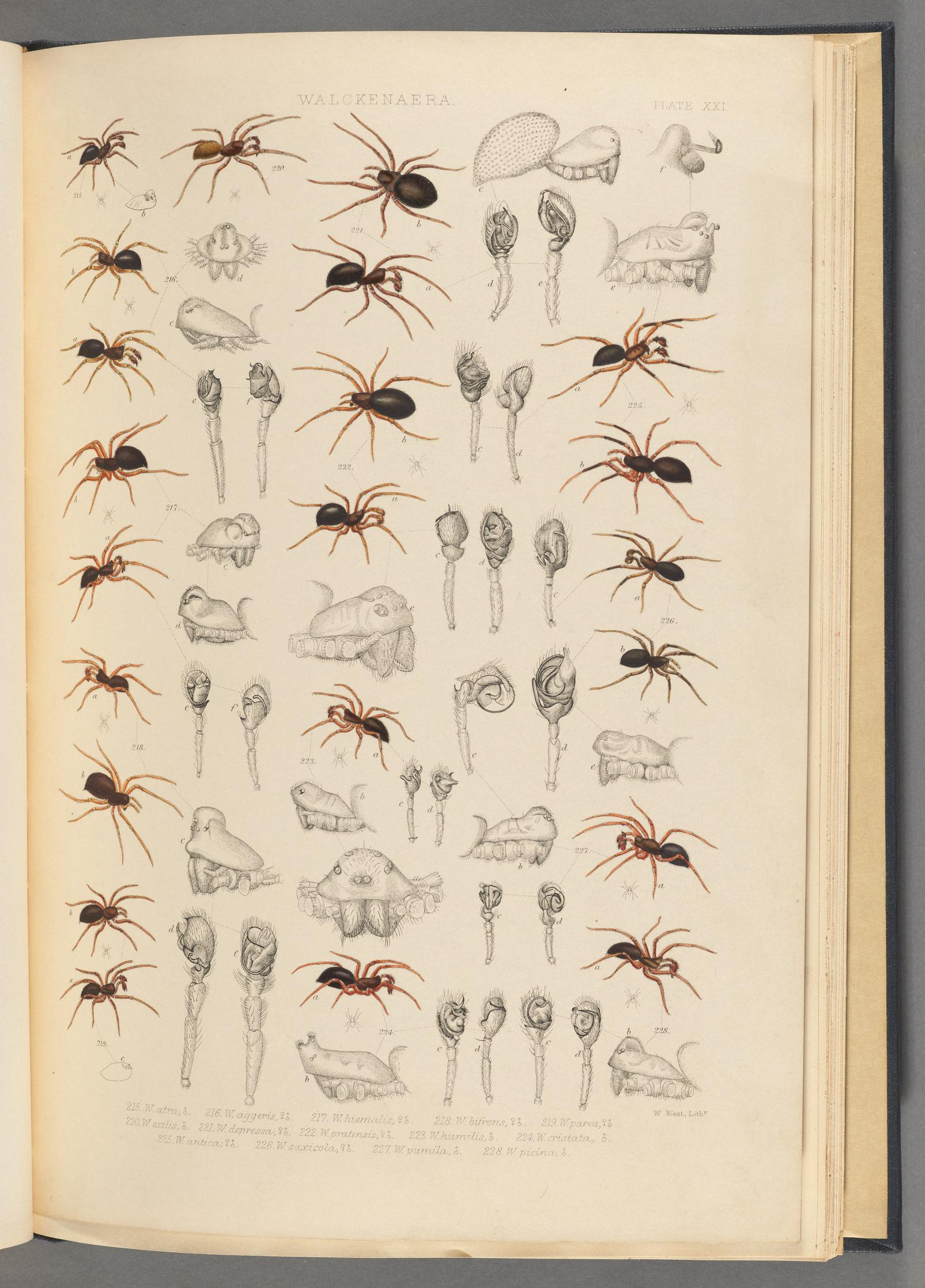
- Trichoncus saxicola (figure 226)

Scientific classification
- Kingdom: Animalia
- Phylum: Arthropoda
- Subphylum: Chelicerata
- Class: Arachnida
- Order: Araneae
- Infraorder: Araneomorphae
- Family: Linyphiidae
- Genus: Trichoncus; Simon, 1884

Type species
- T. scrofa Simon, 1884

Species
- 28, see text

= Trichoncus =

Genus of spiders

Trichoncus is a genus of sheet weavers that was first described by Eugène Louis Simon in 1884.

== Species ==
As of August 2021 it contains twenty-eight species.

- Trichoncus affinis Kulczyński, 1894 – Europe
- Trichoncus ambrosii Wunderlich, 2011 – Switzerland, Italy
- Trichoncus aurantiipes Simon, 1884 – Portugal, Morocco, Algeria, Tunisia
- Trichoncus auritus (L. Koch, 1869) – Europe
- Trichoncus gibbulus Denis, 1944 – France
- Trichoncus hackmani Millidge, 1955 – Central, Northern Europe
- Trichoncus helveticus Denis, 1965 – Switzerland, France
- Trichoncus hirtus Denis, 1965 – France (Corsica)
- Trichoncus hispidosus Tanasevitch, 1990 – Russia
- Trichoncus hyperboreus Eskov, 1992 – Russia
- Trichoncus kenyensis Thaler, 1974 – Kenya
- Trichoncus lanatus Tanasevitch, 1987 – Georgia
- Trichoncus maculatus Fei, Gao & Zhu, 1997 – China
- Trichoncus monticola Denis, 1965 – Spain
- Trichoncus nairobi Russell-Smith & Jocqué, 1986 – Kenya
- Trichoncus orientalis Eskov, 1992 – Russia
- Trichoncus patrizii Caporiacco, 1953 – Italy
- Trichoncus pinguis Simon, 1926 – Spain
- Trichoncus rostralis Tanasevitch, 2013 – Israel
- Trichoncus saxicola (O. Pickard-Cambridge, 1861) – Europe
- Trichoncus scrofa Simon, 1884 (type) – France, Spain (Majorca), Italy to Hungary
- Trichoncus similipes Denis, 1965 – Portugal
- Trichoncus sordidus Simon, 1884 – Europe
- Trichoncus steppensis Eskov, 1995 – Kazakhstan
- Trichoncus trifidus Denis, 1965 – Portugal, Spain
- Trichoncus uncinatus Denis, 1965 – Algeria
- Trichoncus vasconicus Denis, 1944 – Europe, Russia to Kazakhstan
- Trichoncus villius Tanasevitch & Piterkina, 2007 – Russia (Europe), Kazakhstan
