= Kikimora (disambiguation) =

Kikimora (Russian: кики́мора) is a female house spirit in Slavic mythology,

Kikimora may also refer to one of the following.

- Kikimora, a fairy tale tone poem for orchestra by Anatoly Lyadov
- Kikimora Publications, a publishing house associated with the Helsinki University
- Kikimora palustris, a genus from the Linyphiidae spider family
- Kikimora, a secondary character from the Puyo Puyo video game series
- Kikimora, from the Disney Channel TV series The Owl House
