= Drepanotylus =

Scientific classification
- Kingdom: Animalia
- Phylum: Arthropoda
- Subphylum: Chelicerata
- Class: Arachnida
- Order: Araneae
- Infraorder: Araneomorphae
- Family: Linyphiidae
- Genus: Drepanotylus; Holm, 1945

Type species
- D. uncatus (O. Pickard-Cambridge, 1873)

Species
- 5, see text

Genus of spiders

Drepanotylus is a genus of dwarf spiders that was first described by Å. Holm in 1945.

== Species ==
As of May 2019 it contains five species:

- Drepanotylus aduncus Sha & Zhu, 1995 – China
- Drepanotylus borealis Holm, 1945 – Scandinavia, Russia (Europe to Far East)
- Drepanotylus holmi (Eskov, 1981) – Russia (West Siberia to Far East), Mongolia
- Drepanotylus pirinicus Deltshev, 1992 – Bulgaria
- Drepanotylus uncatus (O. Pickard-Cambridge, 1873) (type) – Europe, Russia (Europe to West Siberia)
