= Theoneta =

Scientific classification
- Kingdom: Animalia
- Phylum: Arthropoda
- Subphylum: Chelicerata
- Class: Arachnida
- Order: Araneae
- Infraorder: Araneomorphae
- Family: Linyphiidae
- Genus: Theoneta; Eskov & Marusik, 1991

Type species
- T. saaristoi Eskov & Marusik, 1991

Species
- 2, see text

Genus of spiders

Theoneta is a genus of spiders in the family Linyphiidae. It was first described in 1991 by Eskov & Yuri Marusik.

== Species ==
As of August 2021, it contains 2 species.

- Theoneta aterrima (Eskov & Marusik, 1991) – Russia (north-eastern Siberia to Far East)
- Theoneta saaristoi (Eskov & Marusik, 1991) – Russia (north-eastern Siberia, Far East)
