= Asiophantes =

Scientific classification
- Kingdom: Animalia
- Phylum: Arthropoda
- Subphylum: Chelicerata
- Class: Arachnida
- Order: Araneae
- Infraorder: Araneomorphae
- Family: Linyphiidae
- Genus: Asiophantes; Eskov, 1993

Type species
- A. pacificus Eskov, 1993

Species
- A. pacificus Eskov, 1993 – Russia; A. sibiricus Eskov, 1993 – Russia

Genus of spiders

Asiophantes is a genus of Asian dwarf spiders that was first described by K. Y. Eskov in 1993. As of May 2019 it contains only two species, both found in Russia: A. pacificus and A. sibiricus.
