= Oreophantes =

Scientific classification
- Kingdom: Animalia
- Phylum: Arthropoda
- Subphylum: Chelicerata
- Class: Arachnida
- Order: Araneae
- Infraorder: Araneomorphae
- Family: Linyphiidae
- Genus: Oreophantes; Eskov, 1984
- Species: O. recurvatus

Binomial name
- Oreophantes recurvatus (Emerton, 1913)

Genus of spiders

Oreophantes is a monotypic genus of North American dwarf spiders containing the single species, Oreophantes recurvatus. It was first described by K. Y. Eskov in 1984, and has only been found in the United States and Canada.
