= Nispa =

Scientific classification
- Kingdom: Animalia
- Phylum: Arthropoda
- Subphylum: Chelicerata
- Class: Arachnida
- Order: Araneae
- Infraorder: Araneomorphae
- Family: Linyphiidae
- Genus: Nispa; Eskov, 1993
- Species: N. barbatus

Binomial name
- Nispa barbatus Eskov, 1993

Genus of spiders

Nispa is a monotypic genus of Asian dwarf spiders containing the single species, Nispa barbatus. It was first described by K. Y. Eskov in 1993, and has only been found in Japan and Russia.
