= Nenilinium =

Scientific classification
- Kingdom: Animalia
- Phylum: Arthropoda
- Subphylum: Chelicerata
- Class: Arachnida
- Order: Araneae
- Infraorder: Araneomorphae
- Family: Linyphiidae
- Genus: Nenilinium; Eskov, 1988

Type species
- N. asiaticum Eskov, 1988

Species
- 2, see text

Genus of spiders

Nenilinium is a genus of Asian dwarf spiders that was first described by K. Y. Eskov in 1988.

== Species ==
As of May 2019 it contains two species:

- Nenilinium asiaticum Eskov, 1988 (type) – Russia
- Nenilinium luteolum (Loksa, 1965) – Russia, Mongolia
