= Kolymocyba =

Scientific classification
- Kingdom: Animalia
- Phylum: Arthropoda
- Subphylum: Chelicerata
- Class: Arachnida
- Order: Araneae
- Infraorder: Araneomorphae
- Family: Linyphiidae
- Genus: Kolymocyba; Eskov, 1989
- Species: K. petrophila

Binomial name
- Kolymocyba petrophila Eskov, 1989

Genus of spiders

Kolymocyba is a monotypic genus of Asian dwarf spiders containing the single species, Kolymocyba petrophila. It was first described by K. Y. Eskov in 1989, and has only been found in Russia.
