= Miftengris =

Scientific classification
- Kingdom: Animalia
- Phylum: Arthropoda
- Subphylum: Chelicerata
- Class: Arachnida
- Order: Araneae
- Infraorder: Araneomorphae
- Family: Linyphiidae
- Genus: Miftengris; Eskov, 1993
- Species: M. scutumatus

Binomial name
- Miftengris scutumatus Eskov, 1993

Genus of spiders

Miftengris is a monotypic genus of Asian dwarf spiders containing the single species, Miftengris scutumatus. It was first described by K. Y. Eskov in 1993, and has only been found in Russia.
