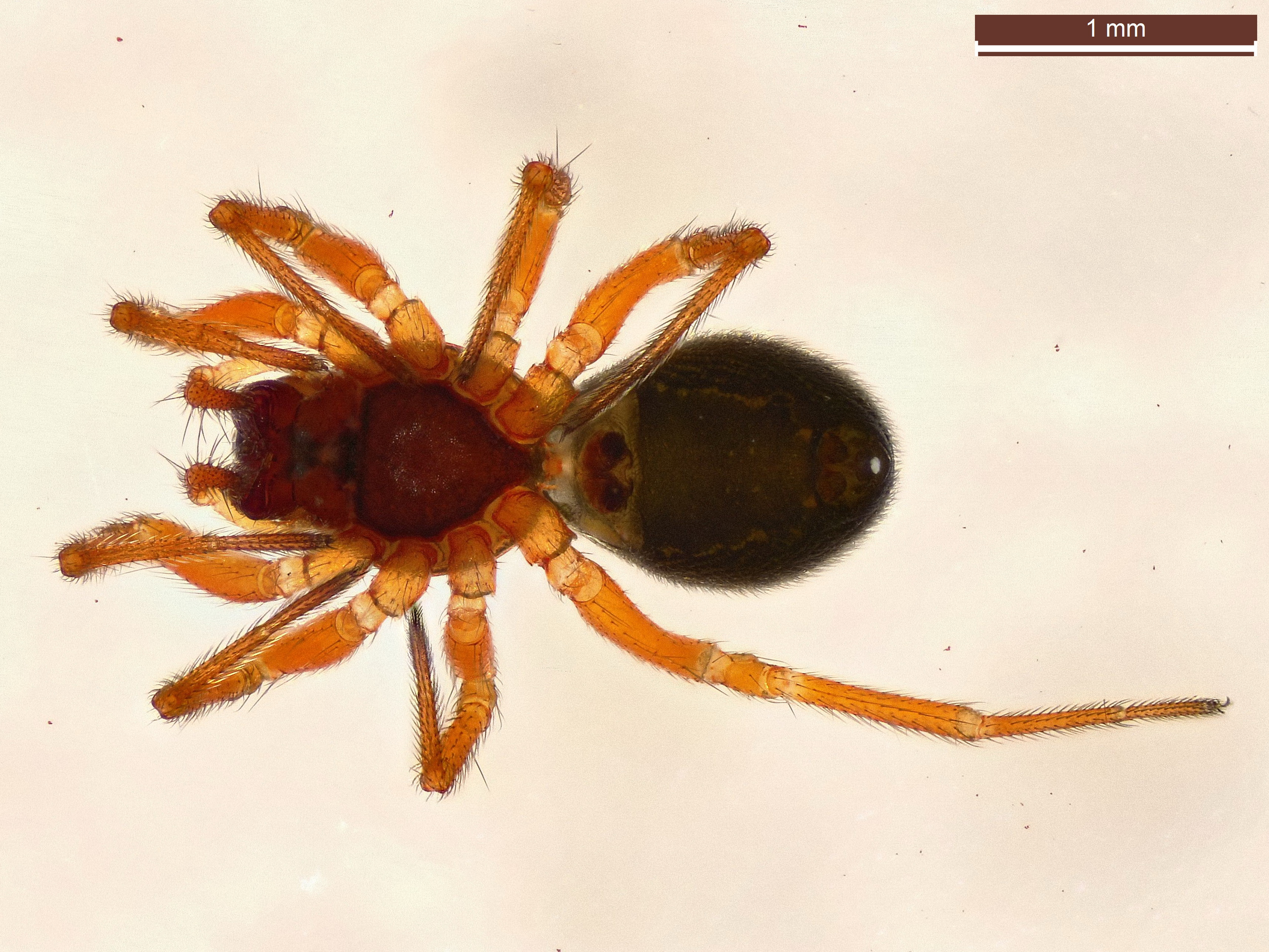
- Gnathonarium dentatum (Wider, 1834)

Scientific classification
- Kingdom: Animalia
- Phylum: Arthropoda
- Subphylum: Chelicerata
- Class: Arachnida
- Order: Araneae
- Infraorder: Araneomorphae
- Family: Linyphiidae
- Genus: Gnathonarium; Karsch, 1881

Type species
- G. dentatum (Wider, 1834)

Species
- 7, see text

= Gnathonarium =

Genus of spiders

Gnathonarium is a genus of dwarf spiders that was first described by Ferdinand Anton Franz Karsch in 1881.

== Species ==
As of May 2019 it contains seven species and one subspecies, found in Canada, China, Israel, Japan, Kazakhstan, Korea, Mongolia, the Philippines, Russia, Turkey, and the United States:

- Gnathonarium biconcavum Tu & Li, 2004 – China
- Gnathonarium dentatum (Wider, 1834) (type) – Europe, North Africa, Turkey, Caucasus, Russia (Europe to Far East), Kazakhstan, Central Asia, China, Korea, Japan
  - Gnathonarium d. orientale (O. Pickard-Cambridge, 1872) – Israel
- Gnathonarium exsiccatum (Bösenberg & Strand, 1906) – Japan
- Gnathonarium gibberum Oi, 1960 – Russia (South Siberia), China, Korea, Japan
- Gnathonarium luzon Tanasevitch, 2017 – Philippines (Luzon)
- Gnathonarium suppositum (Kulczyński, 1885) – Russia (Middle Siberia to Far East), USA (Alaska), Canada
- Gnathonarium taczanowskii (O. Pickard-Cambridge, 1873) – Russia (Urals to Far East), Kazakhstan, Mongolia, China, USA (Alaska), Canada
