= Ivielum =

Scientific classification
- Kingdom: Animalia
- Phylum: Arthropoda
- Subphylum: Chelicerata
- Class: Arachnida
- Order: Araneae
- Infraorder: Araneomorphae
- Family: Linyphiidae
- Genus: Ivielum; Eskov, 1988
- Species: I. sibiricum

Binomial name
- Ivielum sibiricum Eskov, 1988

Genus of spiders

Ivielum is a monotypic genus of dwarf spiders containing the single species Ivielum sibiricum. It was first described by K. Y. Eskov in 1988, and has only been found in Canada, Mongolia, and Russia.
