= Paraeboria =

Scientific classification
- Kingdom: Animalia
- Phylum: Arthropoda
- Subphylum: Chelicerata
- Class: Arachnida
- Order: Araneae
- Infraorder: Araneomorphae
- Family: Linyphiidae
- Genus: Paraeboria; Eskov, 1990
- Species: P. jeniseica

Binomial name
- Paraeboria jeniseica (Eskov, 1981)

Genus of spiders

Paraeboria is a monotypic genus of Asian dwarf spiders containing the single species, Paraeboria jeniseica. It was first described by K. Y. Eskov in 1990, and has only been found in Russia.
