= Parasisis =

Scientific classification
- Kingdom: Animalia
- Phylum: Arthropoda
- Subphylum: Chelicerata
- Class: Arachnida
- Order: Araneae
- Infraorder: Araneomorphae
- Family: Linyphiidae
- Genus: Parasisis; Eskov, 1984
- Species: P. amurensis

Binomial name
- Parasisis amurensis Eskov, 1984

Genus of spiders

Parasisis is a monotypic genus of Asian dwarf spiders containing the single species, Parasisis amurensis. It was first described by K. Y. Eskov in 1984, and has only been found in Russia, China, Korea, and Japan.
