= Asthenargoides =

Scientific classification
- Kingdom: Animalia
- Phylum: Arthropoda
- Subphylum: Chelicerata
- Class: Arachnida
- Order: Araneae
- Infraorder: Araneomorphae
- Family: Linyphiidae
- Genus: Asthenargoides; Eskov, 1993

Type species
- A. logunovi Eskov, 1993

Species
- A. kurenstchikovi Eskov, 1993 – Russia (South Siberia, Far East); A. kurtchevae Eskov, 1993 – Russia (Far East); A. logunovi Eskov, 1993 – Russia (Far East)

Genus of spiders

Asthenargoides is a genus of Asian dwarf spiders that was first described by K. Y. Eskov in 1993. As of May 2019 it contains only three species: A. kurenstchikovi, A. kurtchevae, and A. logunovi.
