= Parhypomma =

Scientific classification
- Kingdom: Animalia
- Phylum: Arthropoda
- Subphylum: Chelicerata
- Class: Arachnida
- Order: Araneae
- Infraorder: Araneomorphae
- Family: Linyphiidae
- Genus: Parhypomma; Eskov, 1992
- Species: P. naraense

Binomial name
- Parhypomma naraense (Oi, 1960)

Genus of spiders

Parhypomma is a monotypic genus of Asian dwarf spiders containing the single species, Parhypomma naraense. It was first described by K. Y. Eskov in 1992, and has only been found in Japan.
