= Pacifiphantes =

Scientific classification
- Kingdom: Animalia
- Phylum: Arthropoda
- Subphylum: Chelicerata
- Class: Arachnida
- Order: Araneae
- Infraorder: Araneomorphae
- Family: Linyphiidae
- Genus: Pacifiphantes; Eskov & Marusik, 1994

Type species
- P. zakharovi Eskov & Marusik, 1994

Species
- 2, see text

Genus of spiders

Pacifiphantes is a genus of dwarf spiders that was first described by K. Y. Eskov & Y. M. Marusik in 1994.

== Species ==
As of May 2019 it contains two species:

- Pacifiphantes magnificus (Chamberlin & Ivie, 1943) – USA, Canada
- Pacifiphantes zakharovi Eskov & Marusik, 1994 (type) – Russia, China, Korea
