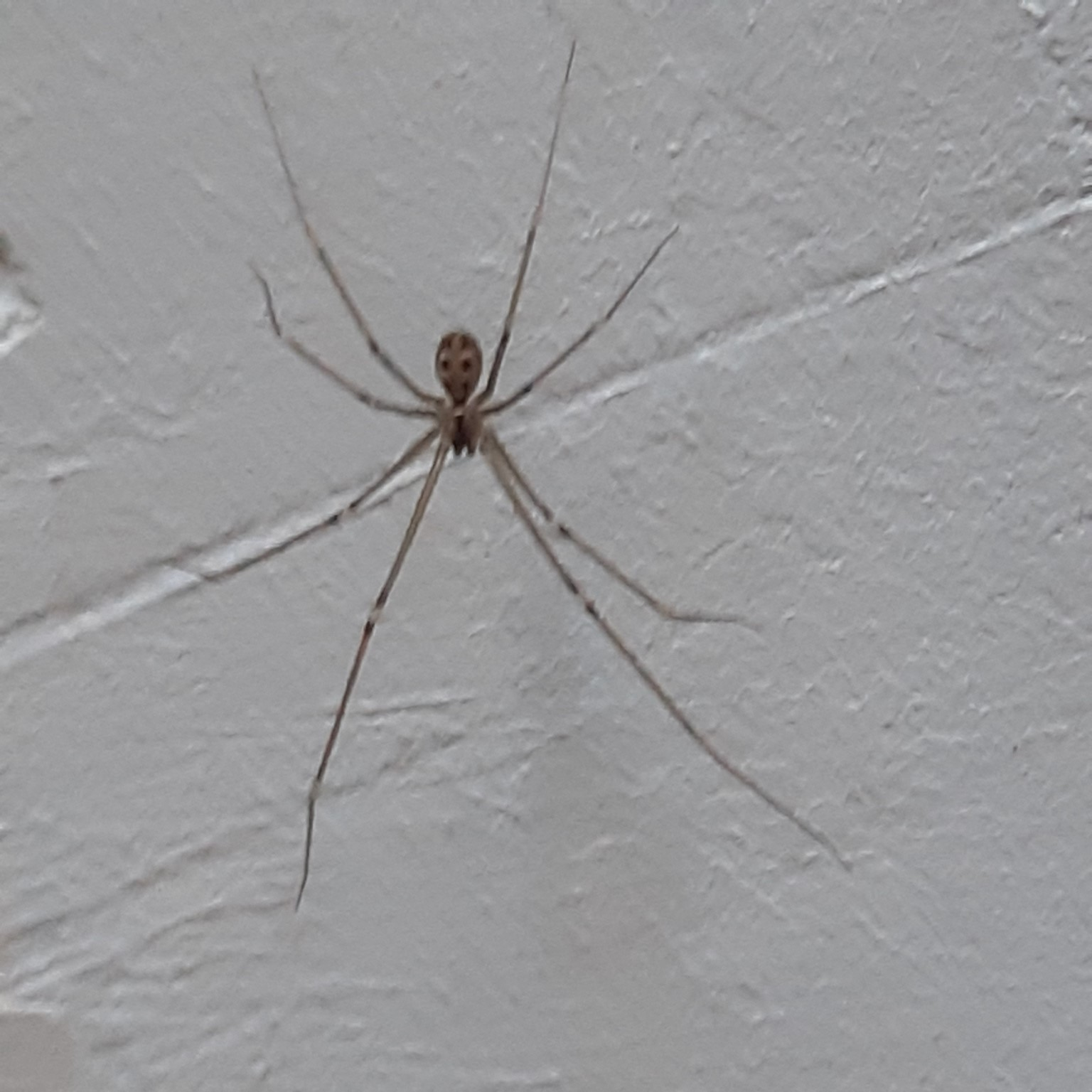
- Hoplopholcus longipes

Scientific classification
- Kingdom: Animalia
- Phylum: Arthropoda
- Subphylum: Chelicerata
- Class: Arachnida
- Order: Araneae
- Infraorder: Araneomorphae
- Family: Pholcidae
- Genus: Hoplopholcus; Kulczyński, 1908

Type species
- H. forskali (Thorell, 1871)

Species
- 16, see text

Synonyms
- Neartema Kratochvíl, 1940

= Hoplopholcus =

Genus of spiders

Hoplopholcus is a genus of cellar spiders that was first described by Władysław Kulczyński in 1908.

== Species ==
As of July 2020 it contains ten species, found only in Asia and Europe:

- Hoplopholcus asiaeminoris Brignoli, 1978 – Turkey
- Hoplopholcus atik (Huber, 2020) – Turkey
- Hoplopholcus bursa (Huber, 2020) – Turkey
- Hoplopholcus cecconii Kulczyński, 1908 – Turkey, Israel, Lebanon
- Hoplopholcus dim (Huber, 2020) – Turkey, Cyprus
- Hoplopholcus figulus Brignoli, 1971 – Greece
- Hoplopholcus forskali (Thorell, 1871) (type) – Eastern Europe to Turkmenistan
- Hoplopholcus gazipasa (Huber, 2020) – Greece, Turkey
- Hoplopholcus konya (Huber, 2020) – Turkey
- Hoplopholcus labyrinthi (Kulczyński, 1903) – Greece (Crete)
- Hoplopholcus longipes (Spassky, 1934) – Greece, Turkey, Caucasus (Russia, Georgia)
- Hoplopholcus minotaurinus Senglet, 1971 – Greece (Crete)
- Hoplopholcus minous Senglet, 1971 – Greece (Crete)
- Hoplopholcus patrizii (Roewer, 1962) – Turkey
- Hoplopholcus suluin (Huber, 2020) – Turkey
- Hoplopholcus trakyaensis Demircan & Topçu, 2017 – Turkey (European part)

== See also ==
- List of Pholcidae species
