= Moebelotinus =

Scientific classification
- Kingdom: Animalia
- Phylum: Arthropoda
- Subphylum: Chelicerata
- Class: Arachnida
- Order: Araneae
- Infraorder: Araneomorphae
- Family: Linyphiidae
- Genus: Moebelotinus; Wunderlich, 1995
- Species: M. transbaikalicus

Binomial name
- Moebelotinus transbaikalicus (Eskov, 1989)

Genus of spiders

Moebelotinus is a monotypic genus of Asian dwarf spiders containing the single species, Moebelotinus transbaikalicus. It was first described by J. Wunderlich in 1995, and has only been found in Mongolia and Russia.
