= Paraglyphesis =

Scientific classification
- Kingdom: Animalia
- Phylum: Arthropoda
- Subphylum: Chelicerata
- Class: Arachnida
- Order: Araneae
- Infraorder: Araneomorphae
- Family: Linyphiidae
- Genus: Paraglyphesis; Eskov, 1991

Type species
- P. polaris Eskov, 1991

Species
- 3, see text

Genus of spiders

Paraglyphesis is a genus of Asian dwarf spiders that was first described by K. Y. Eskov in 1991.

== Species ==
As of May 2019 it contains three species:

- Paraglyphesis lasiargoides Eskov, 1991 – Russia
- Paraglyphesis monticola Eskov, 1991 – Russia
- Paraglyphesis polaris Eskov, 1991 (type) – Russia
