= Concavocephalus =

Scientific classification
- Kingdom: Animalia
- Phylum: Arthropoda
- Subphylum: Chelicerata
- Class: Arachnida
- Order: Araneae
- Infraorder: Araneomorphae
- Family: Linyphiidae
- Genus: Concavocephalus; Eskov, 1989

Type species
- C. rubens Eskov, 1989

Species
- C. eskovi Marusik & Tanasevitch, 2003 – Russia (South Siberia); C. rubens Eskov, 1989 – Russia (Middle Siberia to Far East)

Genus of spiders

Concavocephalus is a genus of Asian dwarf spiders that was first described by K. Y. Eskov in 1989. As of May 2019 it contains only two species: C. eskovi and C. rubens.
