= Holminaria =

Scientific classification
- Kingdom: Animalia
- Phylum: Arthropoda
- Subphylum: Chelicerata
- Class: Arachnida
- Order: Araneae
- Infraorder: Araneomorphae
- Family: Linyphiidae
- Genus: Holminaria; Eskov, 1991

Type species
- H. sibirica Eskov, 1991

Species
- H. pallida Eskov, 1991 – Russia (Middle and north-eastern Siberia); H. prolata (O. Pickard-Cambridge, 1873) – Russia (Middle Siberia to Far East); H. sibirica Eskov, 1991 – Russia (Middle Siberia to Far East), Mongolia, China

Genus of spiders

Holminaria is a genus of Asian dwarf spiders that was first described by K. Y. Eskov in 1991. As of May 2019 it contains only three species, found in China, Mongolia, and Russia: H. pallida, H. prolata, and H. sibirica.
