= Proislandiana =

Scientific classification
- Kingdom: Animalia
- Phylum: Arthropoda
- Subphylum: Chelicerata
- Class: Arachnida
- Order: Araneae
- Infraorder: Araneomorphae
- Family: Linyphiidae
- Genus: Proislandiana (Kulczyński, 1908)

Type species
- P. pallida (Kulczyński, 1908)

Species
- 2, see text

Genus of spiders

Proislandiana is a genus of sheet weavers first described by A. V. Tanasevitch in 1985.

== Species ==
As of May 2021 it contains two species:

- Proislandiana beroni Dimitrov, 2020 –Turkey, Armenia
- Proislandiana pallida (Kulczyński, 1908) – Russia (Europe to north-eastern Siberia)
