= Nippononeta =

Scientific classification
- Kingdom: Animalia
- Phylum: Arthropoda
- Subphylum: Chelicerata
- Class: Arachnida
- Order: Araneae
- Infraorder: Araneomorphae
- Family: Linyphiidae
- Genus: Nippononeta; Eskov, 1992

Type species
- N. kurilensis Eskov, 1992

Species
- 25, see text

Genus of spiders

Nippononeta is a genus of Asian dwarf spiders that was first described by K. Y. Eskov in 1992.

== Species ==
As of May 2021 it contains twenty-five species:

- Nippononeta alpina (Li & Zhu, 1993) – China
- Nippononeta bituberculata Seo, 2018 – Korea
- Nippononeta bursa Yin, 2012 – China
- Nippononeta cheunghensis (Paik, 1978) – Korea
- Nippononeta coreana (Paik, 1991) – China, Korea
- Nippononeta elongata Ono & Saito, 2001 – Japan
- Nippononeta embolica Tanasevitch, 2005 – Russia
- Nippononeta kaiensis Ono & Saito, 2001 – Japan
- Nippononeta kantonis Ono & Saito, 2001 – Japan
- Nippononeta kurilensis Eskov, 1992 (type) – Russia, Japan
- Nippononeta masatakana Ono & Saito, 2001 – Japan
- Nippononeta masudai Ono & Saito, 2001 – Japan
- Nippononeta minuta (Oi, 1960) – Japan
- Nippononeta nodosa (Oi, 1960) – Japan
- Nippononeta obliqua (Oi, 1960) – Korea, Japan
- Nippononeta ogatai Ono & Saito, 2001 – Japan
- Nippononeta okumae Ono & Saito, 2001 – Japan
- Nippononeta onoi Bao, Bai & Tu, 2017 – Japan
- Nippononeta pentagona (Oi, 1960) – Mongolia, Japan
- Nippononeta projecta (Oi, 1960) – Mongolia, Korea, Japan
- Nippononeta silvicola Ono & Saito, 2001 – Japan
- Nippononeta sinica Tanasevitch, 2006 – China
- Nippononeta subnigra Ono & Saito, 2001 – Japan
- Nippononeta ungulata (Oi, 1960) – Korea, Japan
- Nippononeta xiphoidea Ono & Saito, 2001 – Japan
