= Oryphantes =

Scientific classification
- Kingdom: Animalia
- Phylum: Arthropoda
- Subphylum: Chelicerata
- Class: Arachnida
- Order: Araneae
- Infraorder: Araneomorphae
- Family: Linyphiidae
- Genus: Oryphantes; Hull, 1932

Type species
- O. angulatus (O. Pickard-Cambridge, 1881)

Species
- 5, see text

Genus of spiders

Oryphantes is a genus of dwarf spiders that was first described by J. E. Hull in 1932.

== Species ==
As of May 2019 it contains five species:

- Oryphantes aliquantulus Dupérré & Paquin, 2007 – USA, Canada
- Oryphantes angulatus (O. Pickard-Cambridge, 1881) (type) – Europe
- Oryphantes bipilis (Kulczyński, 1885) – Russia
- Oryphantes cognatus (Tanasevitch, 1992) – Russia
- Oryphantes geminus (Tanasevitch, 1982) – Russia, Kazakhstan
