= Perlongipalpus =

Scientific classification
- Kingdom: Animalia
- Phylum: Arthropoda
- Subphylum: Chelicerata
- Class: Arachnida
- Order: Araneae
- Infraorder: Araneomorphae
- Family: Linyphiidae
- Genus: Perlongipalpus; Eskov & Marusik, 1991

Type species
- P. pinipumilis Eskov & Marusik, 1991

Species
- 4, see text

Genus of spiders

Perlongipalpus is a genus of Asian dwarf spiders that was first described by K. Y. Eskov & Y. M. Marusik in 1991.

== Species ==
As of May 2019 it contains four species, found in Russia and Mongolia:

- Perlongipalpus mannilai Eskov & Marusik, 1991 – Russia
- Perlongipalpus mongolicus Marusik & Koponen, 2008 – Mongolia
- Perlongipalpus pinipumilis Eskov & Marusik, 1991 (type) – Russia
- Perlongipalpus saaristoi Marusik & Koponen, 2008 – Russia
