= Procerocymbium =

Scientific classification
- Kingdom: Animalia
- Phylum: Arthropoda
- Subphylum: Chelicerata
- Class: Arachnida
- Order: Araneae
- Infraorder: Araneomorphae
- Family: Linyphiidae
- Genus: Procerocymbium; Eskov, 1989

Type species
- P. sibiricum Eskov, 1989

Species
- 4, see text

Genus of spiders

Procerocymbium is a genus of sheet weavers that was first described by K. Y. Eskov in 1989.

== Species ==
As of May 2019 it contains four species:

- Procerocymbium buryaticum Marusik & Koponen, 2001 – Russia
- Procerocymbium dondalei Marusik & Koponen, 2001 – Canada
- Procerocymbium jeniseicum Marusik & Koponen, 2001 – Russia
- Procerocymbium sibiricum Eskov, 1989 (type) – Russia
