= Bishopiana =

Scientific classification
- Kingdom: Animalia
- Phylum: Arthropoda
- Subphylum: Chelicerata
- Class: Arachnida
- Order: Araneae
- Infraorder: Araneomorphae
- Family: Linyphiidae
- Genus: Bishopiana; Eskov, 1988

Type species
- B. hypoarctica Eskov, 1988

Species
- B. glumacea (Gao, Fei & Zhu, 1992) – Russia (South Siberia), China; B. hypoarctica Eskov, 1988 – Russia (Middle and north-eastern Siberia)

Genus of spiders

Bishopiana is a genus of Asian dwarf spiders that was first described by K. Y. Eskov in 1988. As of May 2019 it contains only two species: B. glumacea and B. hypoarctica.
