= Frontella =

Scientific classification
- Kingdom: Animalia
- Phylum: Arthropoda
- Subphylum: Chelicerata
- Class: Arachnida
- Order: Araneae
- Infraorder: Araneomorphae
- Family: Linyphiidae
- Genus: Frontella; Kulczyński, 1908
- Species: F. pallida

Binomial name
- Frontella pallida Kulczyński, 1908

Genus of spiders

Frontella is a monotypic genus of Asian dwarf spiders containing the single species, Frontella pallida. It was first described by Władysław Kulczyński in 1908, and has only been found in Russia.
