= Neserigone =

Scientific classification
- Kingdom: Animalia
- Phylum: Arthropoda
- Subphylum: Chelicerata
- Class: Arachnida
- Order: Araneae
- Infraorder: Araneomorphae
- Family: Linyphiidae
- Genus: Neserigone; Eskov, 1992

Type species
- N. basarukini Eskov, 1992

Species
- 3, see text

Genus of spiders

Neserigone is a genus of Asian dwarf spiders that was first described by K. Y. Eskov in 1992.

== Species ==
As of May 2019 it contains three species:

- Neserigone basarukini Eskov, 1992 (type) – Russia (Far East), Japan
- Neserigone nigriterminorum (Oi, 1960) – Japan
- Neserigone torquipalpis (Oi, 1960) – Japan
