= Troxochrota =

Scientific classification
- Kingdom: Animalia
- Phylum: Arthropoda
- Subphylum: Chelicerata
- Class: Arachnida
- Order: Araneae
- Infraorder: Araneomorphae
- Family: Linyphiidae
- Genus: Troxochrota; Kulczyński, 1894

Type species
- T. scabra Kulczyński, 1894

Species
- 2, see text

Genus of spiders

Troxochrota is a genus of sheet weavers that was first described by C. Chyzer & Władysław Kulczyński in 1894.

== Species ==
As of June 2019 it contains only two species.

- Troxochrota kashmirica (Caporiacco, 1935) – Kashmir
- Troxochrota scabra Kulczyński, 1894 – Central and northern Europe, Russia (Europe)
