= Mecynargoides =

Scientific classification
- Kingdom: Animalia
- Phylum: Arthropoda
- Subphylum: Chelicerata
- Class: Arachnida
- Order: Araneae
- Infraorder: Araneomorphae
- Family: Linyphiidae
- Genus: Mecynargoides; Eskov, 1988
- Species: M. kolymensis

Binomial name
- Mecynargoides kolymensis Eskov, 1988

Genus of spiders

Mecynargoides is a monotypic genus of Asian dwarf spiders containing the single species, Mecynargoides kolymensis. It was first described by K. Y. Eskov in 1988, and has only been found in Mongolia and Russia.
