= Tusukuru =

Scientific classification
- Kingdom: Animalia
- Phylum: Arthropoda
- Subphylum: Chelicerata
- Class: Arachnida
- Order: Araneae
- Infraorder: Araneomorphae
- Family: Linyphiidae
- Genus: Tusukuru; Eskov, 1993

Type species
- T. tamburinus Eskov, 1993

Species
- 2, see text

Genus of spiders

Tusukuru is a genus of sheet weavers that was first described by K. Y. Eskov in 1993.

== Species ==
As of June 2019 it contains only two species:

- Tusukuru hartlandianus (Emerton, 1913) – USA
- Tusukuru tamburinus Eskov, 1993 – Russia
