= Dactylopisthoides =

Scientific classification
- Kingdom: Animalia
- Phylum: Arthropoda
- Subphylum: Chelicerata
- Class: Arachnida
- Order: Araneae
- Infraorder: Araneomorphae
- Family: Linyphiidae
- Genus: Dactylopisthoides; Eskov, 1990
- Species: D. hyperboreus

Binomial name
- Dactylopisthoides hyperboreus Eskov, 1990

Genus of spiders

Dactylopisthoides is a monotypic genus of Asian dwarf spiders containing the single species, Dactylopisthoides hyperboreus. It was first described by K. Y. Eskov in 1990, and has only been found in Russia.
