= Erigonoploides =

Scientific classification
- Kingdom: Animalia
- Phylum: Arthropoda
- Subphylum: Chelicerata
- Class: Arachnida
- Order: Araneae
- Infraorder: Araneomorphae
- Family: Linyphiidae
- Genus: Erigonoploides; Eskov, 1989
- Species: E. cardiratus

Binomial name
- Erigonoploides cardiratus Eskov, 1989

Genus of spiders

Erigonoploides is a monotypic genus of Asian dwarf spiders containing the single species, Erigonoploides cardiratus. It was first described by K. Y. Eskov in 1989, and has only been found in Russia.
