= Pseudomicrargus =

Scientific classification
- Kingdom: Animalia
- Phylum: Arthropoda
- Subphylum: Chelicerata
- Class: Arachnida
- Order: Araneae
- Infraorder: Araneomorphae
- Family: Linyphiidae
- Genus: Pseudomicrargus; Eskov, 1992

Type species
- P. acuitegulatus (Oi, 1960)

Species
- 3, see text

Genus of spiders

Pseudomicrargus is a genus of East Asian sheet weavers that was first described by K. Y. Eskov in 1992.

== Species ==
As of May 2019 it contains three species:

- Pseudomicrargus acuitegulatus (Oi, 1960) (type) – Japan
- Pseudomicrargus asakawaensis (Oi, 1964) – Japan
- Pseudomicrargus latitegulatus (Oi, 1960) – Japan
