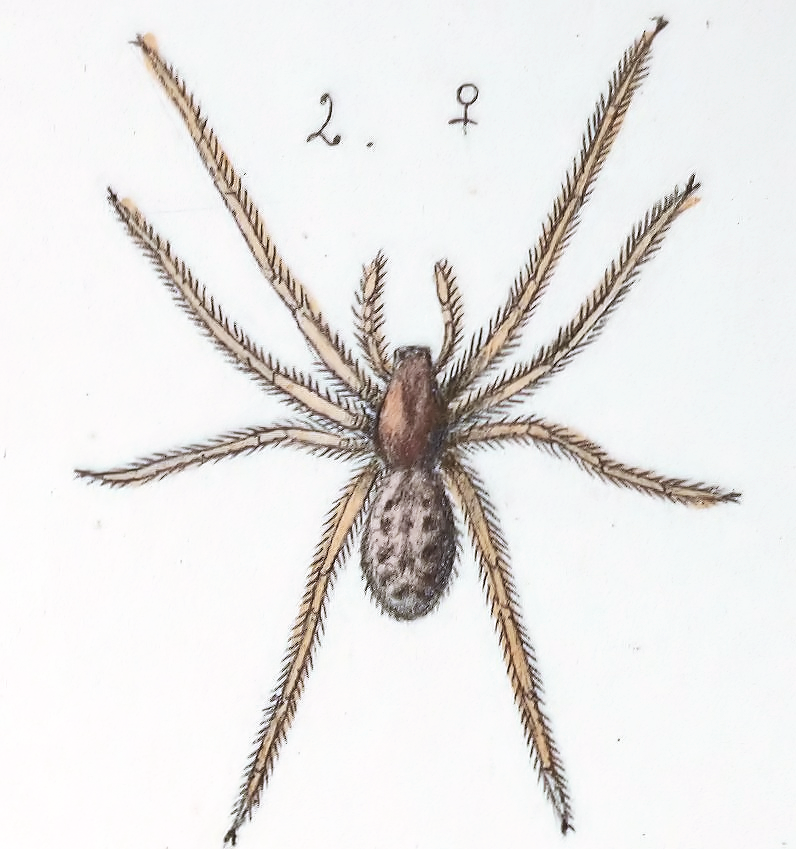
- Female

Scientific classification
- Kingdom: Animalia
- Phylum: Arthropoda
- Subphylum: Chelicerata
- Class: Arachnida
- Order: Araneae
- Infraorder: Araneomorphae
- Family: Linyphiidae
- Genus: Poeciloneta; Kulczyński, 1894

Type species
- P. variegata (Blackwall, 1841)

Species
- 14, see text

= Poeciloneta =

Genus of spiders

Poeciloneta is a genus of sheet weavers that was first described by C. Chyzer & Władysław Kulczyński in 1894.

== Species ==
As of October 2026 it contains sixteen species:

- Poeciloneta ancora Zhai & Zhu, 2008 – China
- Poeciloneta bellona Chamberlin & Ivie, 1943 – USA
- Poeciloneta bihamata Emerton, 1882 – USA
- Poeciloneta calcaratus Emerton, 1909 – Canada, USA
- Poeciloneta canionis Chamberlin & Ivie, 1943 – USA
- Poeciloneta duinanensi Xu, 2026 – China
- Poeciloneta fructuosa Keyserling, 1886 – USA
- Poeciloneta jidingensis Xu, 2026 – China
- Poeciloneta lyrica (Zorsch, 1937) – North America
- Poeciloneta pallida Kulczyński, 1908 – Russia
- Poeciloneta petrophila Tanasevitch, 1989 – Russia, Canada
- Poeciloneta tanasevitchi Marusik, 1991 – Russia
- Poeciloneta theridiformis Emerton, 1911 – Russia, North America
- Poeciloneta vakkhanka Tanasevitch, 1989 – Russia, USA (Alaska), Canada
- Poeciloneta variegata Blackwall, 1841 (type) – North America, Europe, Russia (European to Far East), China
- Poeciloneta xizangensis Zhai & Zhu, 2008 – China
