= Asiceratinops =

Scientific classification
- Kingdom: Animalia
- Phylum: Arthropoda
- Subphylum: Chelicerata
- Class: Arachnida
- Order: Araneae
- Infraorder: Araneomorphae
- Family: Linyphiidae
- Genus: Asiceratinops; Eskov, 1992

Type species
- A. amurensis (Eskov, 1992)

Species
- A. amurensis (Eskov, 1992) – Russia (Far East); A. kolymensis (Eskov, 1992) – Russia (Middle Siberia to Far East)

Genus of spiders

Asiceratinops is a genus of Asian dwarf spiders that was first described by K. Y. Eskov in 1992. As of May 2019 it contains only two species: A. amurensis and A. kolymensis.
