= Pseudoporrhomma =

Scientific classification
- Kingdom: Animalia
- Phylum: Arthropoda
- Subphylum: Chelicerata
- Class: Arachnida
- Order: Araneae
- Infraorder: Araneomorphae
- Family: Linyphiidae
- Genus: Pseudoporrhomma; Eskov, 1993
- Species: P. maritimum

Binomial name
- Pseudoporrhomma maritimum Eskov, 1993

Genus of spiders

Pseudoporrhomma is a monotypic genus of Asian sheet weavers containing the single species, Pseudoporrhomma maritimum. It was first described by K. Y. Eskov in 1993, and has only been found in Russia.
