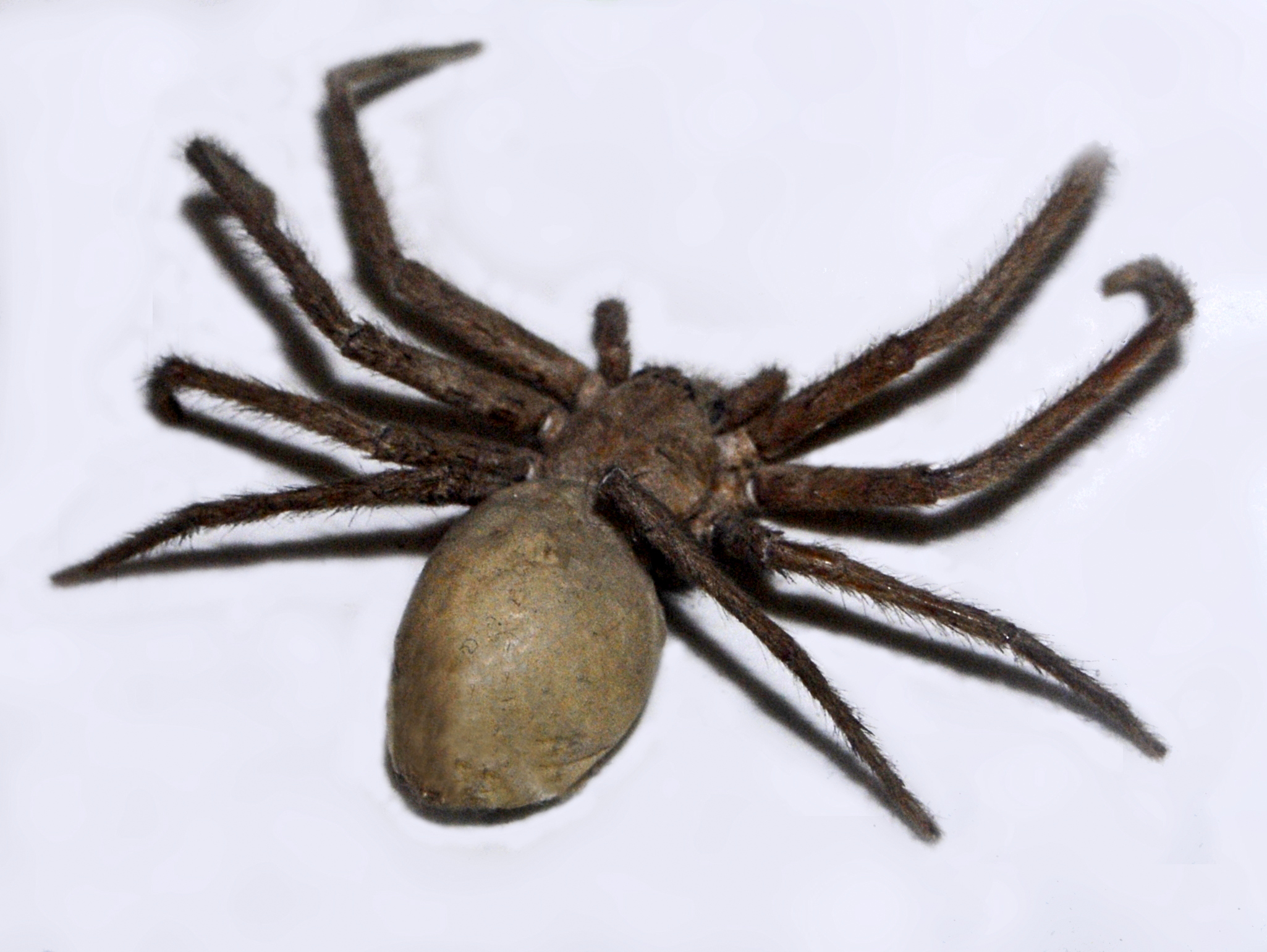
- Museum specimen of Gnathopalystes kochi from Myanmar

Scientific classification
- Kingdom: Animalia
- Phylum: Arthropoda
- Subphylum: Chelicerata
- Class: Arachnida
- Order: Araneae
- Infraorder: Araneomorphae
- Family: Sparassidae
- Genus: Gnathopalystes; Rainbow, 1899

Type species
- G. ferox Rainbow, 1899

Species
- 11, see text

= Gnathopalystes =

Genus of spiders

Gnathopalystes is a genus of huntsman spiders that was first described by William Joseph Rainbow in 1899.

== Species ==
As of November 2022 it contains ten species, found in Oceania and Asia:

- Gnathopalystes aureolus (He & Hu, 2000) – China (Hainan)
- Gnathopalystes crucifer (Simon, 1880) – Malaysia or Indonesia (Java)
- Gnathopalystes denticulatus (Saha & Raychaudhuri, 2007) – India
- Gnathopalystes ferox Rainbow, 1899 (type) – Vanuatu
- Gnathopalystes flavidus (Simon, 1897) – Pakistan, India
- Gnathopalystes ignicomus (L. Koch, 1875) – Papua New Guinea (New Ireland, New Britain)
- Gnathopalystes kochi (Simon, 1880) – India, Myanmar, Malaysia, Indonesia (Java, Sumatra, Borneo)
- Gnathopalystes nigriventer (Kulczyński, 1910) – New Guinea, Solomon Is.
- Gnathopalystes nigrocornutus (Merian, 1911) – Indonesia (Sulawesi)
- Gnathopalystes rutilans (Simon, 1899) – Indonesia (Sumatra)
- Gnathopalystes taiwanensis Zhu & Tso, 2006 – Taiwan
