= Urocoras longispina =

Scientific classification
- Kingdom: Animalia
- Phylum: Arthropoda
- Subphylum: Chelicerata
- Class: Arachnida
- Order: Araneae
- Infraorder: Araneomorphae
- Family: Agelenidae
- Genus: Urocoras
- Species: U. longispina

Binomial name
- Urocoras longispina (Kulczynski, 1897)

Synonyms
- Amaurobius longispina (Kulczyński, in Chyzer & Kulczyński, 1897); Coelotes longispina Kulczyński, in Chyzer & Kulczyński, 1897; Coelotes longispinus (Kulczyński, in Chyzer & Kulczyński, 1897), orth. var.; Urocoras longispinus (Kulczyński, in Chyzer & Kulczyński, 1897), orth. var.

Species of spider

Urocoras longispina is a funnel weaver spider species found in Central and Eastern Europe. It was first described by Władysław Kulczyński in 1897 as Coelotes longispina. The specific name longispina is a noun, so does not change with the gender of the genus.
