= Crosbylonia =

Scientific classification
- Kingdom: Animalia
- Phylum: Arthropoda
- Subphylum: Chelicerata
- Class: Arachnida
- Order: Araneae
- Infraorder: Araneomorphae
- Family: Linyphiidae
- Genus: Crosbylonia; Eskov, 1988
- Species: C. borealis

Binomial name
- Crosbylonia borealis Eskov, 1988

Genus of spiders

Crosbylonia is a monotypic genus of Asian dwarf spiders containing the single species, Crosbylonia borealis. It was first described by K. Y. Eskov in 1988, and has only been found in Russia.
