= Pseudohilaira =

Scientific classification
- Kingdom: Animalia
- Phylum: Arthropoda
- Subphylum: Chelicerata
- Class: Arachnida
- Order: Araneae
- Infraorder: Araneomorphae
- Family: Linyphiidae
- Genus: Pseudohilaira; Eskov, 1990
- Species: P. mirabilis

Binomial name
- Pseudohilaira mirabilis Eskov, 1990

Genus of spiders

Pseudohilaira is a monotypic genus of Asian sheet weavers containing the single species, Pseudohilaira mirabilis. It was first described by K. Y. Eskov in 1990, and has only been found in Russia.
