= Urocoras =

Scientific classification
- Kingdom: Animalia
- Phylum: Arthropoda
- Subphylum: Chelicerata
- Class: Arachnida
- Order: Araneae
- Infraorder: Araneomorphae
- Family: Agelenidae
- Genus: Urocoras; Ovtchinnikov, 1999

Type species
- U. longispina (Kulczyński, 1897)

Species
- 4, see text

Genus of spiders

Urocoras is a genus of funnel weavers first described by S. V. Ovtchinnikov in 1999.

== Species ==
As of October 2026 it contains four species:

- Urocoras longispina (Kulczyński, 1897) – Central, Eastern Europe
- Urocoras matesianus (de Blauwe, 1973) – Italy
- Urocoras munieri (Simon, 1880) – Italy, Slovenia, Croatia
- Urocoras nicomedis (Brignoli, 1978) – Turkey
