= Semljicola lapponicus =

Scientific classification
- Kingdom: Animalia
- Phylum: Arthropoda
- Subphylum: Chelicerata
- Class: Arachnida
- Order: Araneae
- Infraorder: Araneomorphae
- Family: Linyphiidae
- Genus: Semljicola
- Species: S. lapponicus

Binomial name
- Semljicola lapponicus (Holm, 1939)

Species of spider

Semljicola lapponicus is a spider species found in Scandinavia, Russia and Alaska.
