= Semljicola caliginosus =

Scientific classification
- Kingdom: Animalia
- Phylum: Arthropoda
- Subphylum: Chelicerata
- Class: Arachnida
- Order: Araneae
- Infraorder: Araneomorphae
- Family: Linyphiidae
- Genus: Semljicola
- Species: S. caliginosus

Binomial name
- Semljicola caliginosus (Falconer, 1910)

Species of spider

Semljicola caliginosus is a spider species found in Britain, Norway, and Russia.
