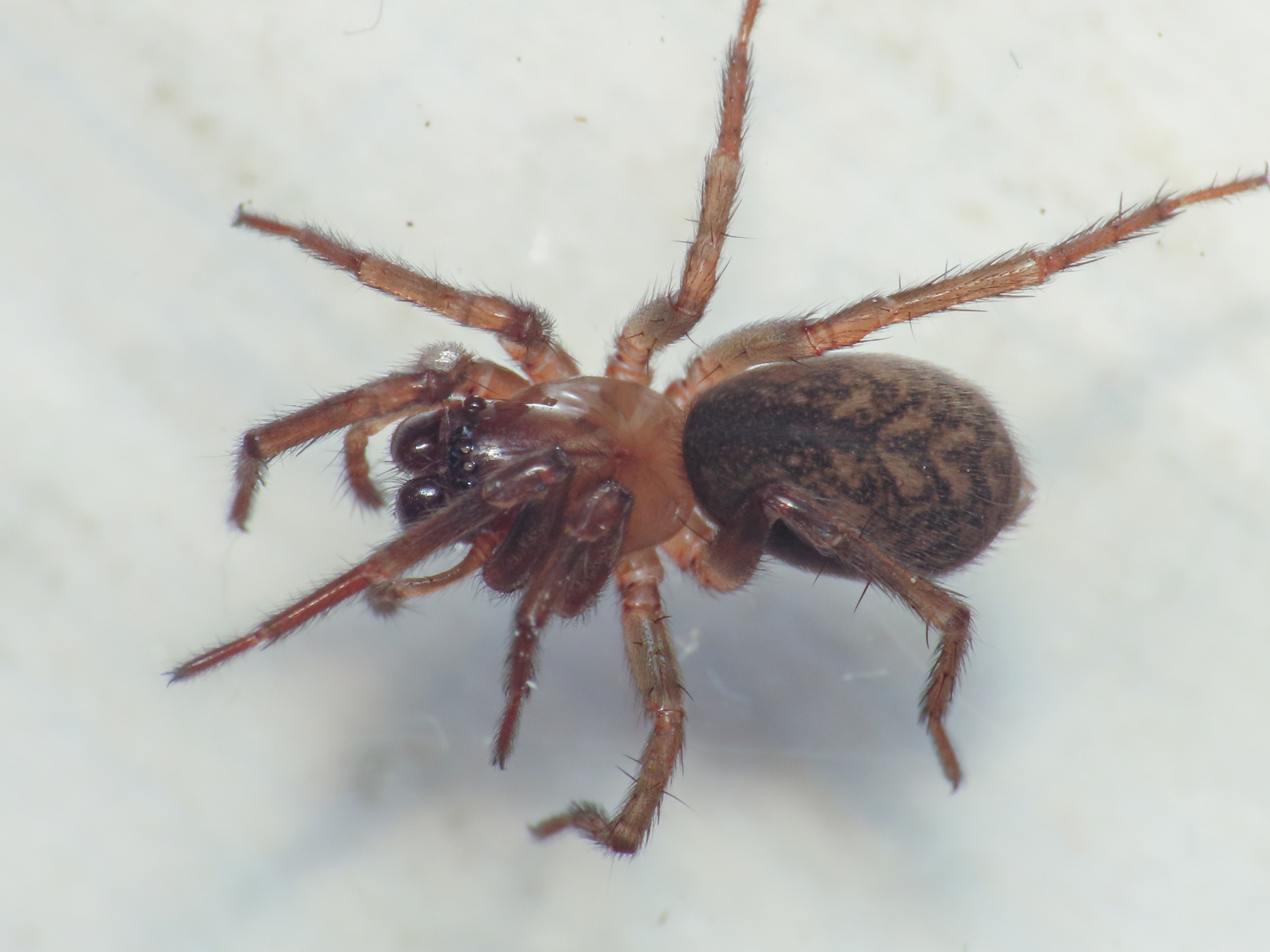

Scientific classification
- Kingdom: Animalia
- Phylum: Arthropoda
- Subphylum: Chelicerata
- Class: Arachnida
- Order: Araneae
- Infraorder: Araneomorphae
- Family: Agelenidae
- Genus: Urocoras
- Species: U. matesianus

Binomial name
- Urocoras matesianus (de Blauwe, 1973)

= Urocoras matesianus =

Species of spider

Urocoras matesianus is a species of funnel weaver spider found in Italy.
