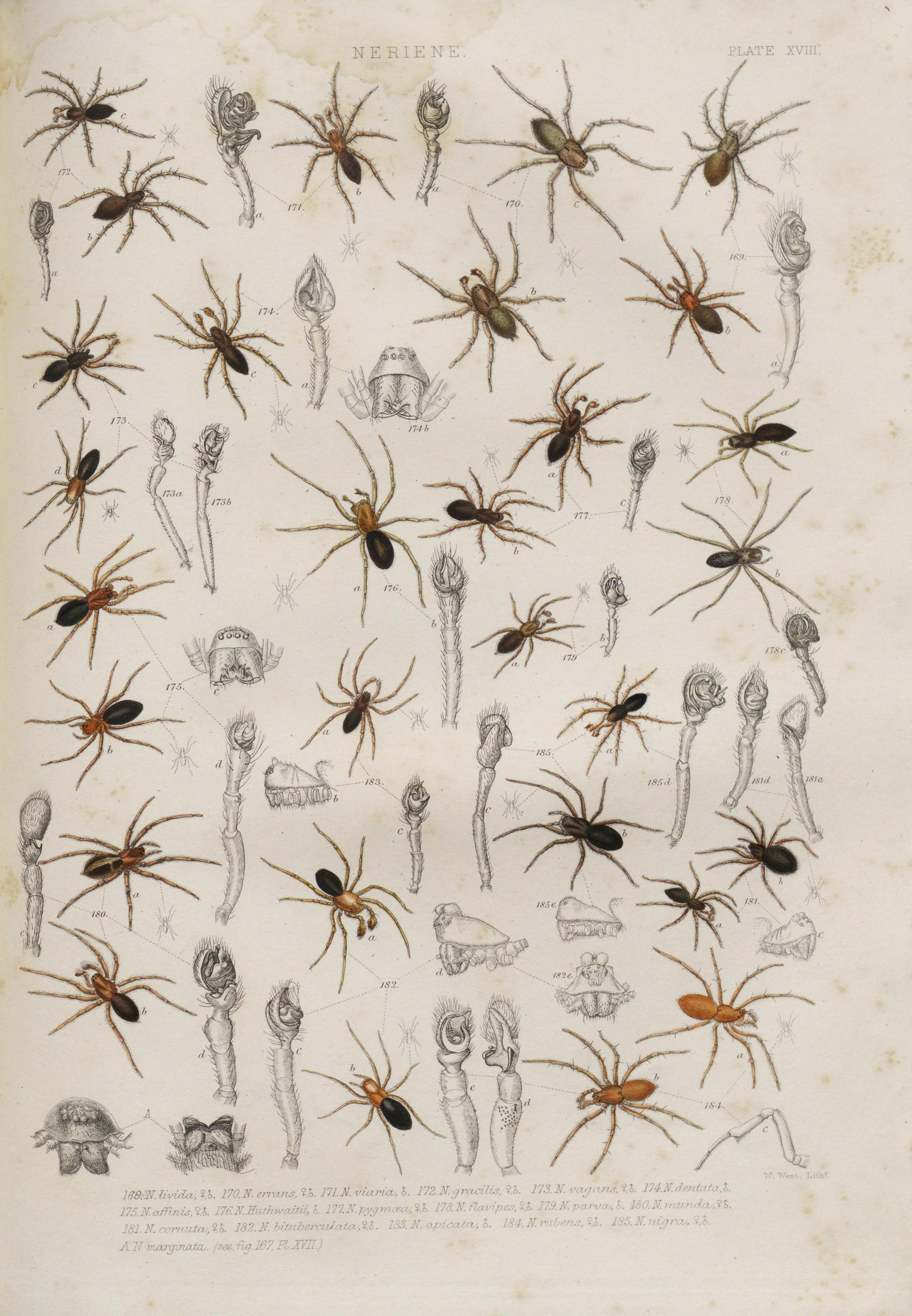

Scientific classification
- Domain: Eukaryota
- Kingdom: Animalia
- Phylum: Arthropoda
- Subphylum: Chelicerata
- Class: Arachnida
- Order: Araneae
- Infraorder: Araneomorphae
- Family: Linyphiidae
- Genus: Dicymbium
- Species: D. nigrum

Binomial name
- Dicymbium nigrum (Blackwall, 1834)

= Dicymbium nigrum =

Species of spider

Dicymbium nigrum is a species of dwarf spider in the family Linyphiidae. It is found in Europe, Turkey, Caucasus, a range from Russia to Central Asia, and China.

== Subspecies ==
These two subspecies belong to the species Dicymbium nigrum:

- (Dicymbium nigrum nigrum) (Blackwall, 1834)
- Dicymbium nigrum brevisetosum Locket, 1962
