= Hoplopholcus minotaurinus =

Conservation status
- Least Concern (IUCN 3.1)

Scientific classification
- Kingdom: Animalia
- Phylum: Arthropoda
- Subphylum: Chelicerata
- Class: Arachnida
- Order: Araneae
- Infraorder: Araneomorphae
- Family: Pholcidae
- Genus: Hoplopholcus
- Species: H. minotaurinus

Binomial name
- Hoplopholcus minotaurinus Senglet, 1971

Species of spider

Hoplopholcus minotaurinus is a cellar spider species found in Crete.

== See also ==
- List of Pholcidae species
