= Hoplopholcus labyrinthi =

Scientific classification
- Domain: Eukaryota
- Kingdom: Animalia
- Phylum: Arthropoda
- Subphylum: Chelicerata
- Class: Arachnida
- Order: Araneae
- Infraorder: Araneomorphae
- Family: Pholcidae
- Genus: Hoplopholcus
- Species: H. labyrinthi

Binomial name
- Hoplopholcus labyrinthi (Kulczynski, 1903)

Species of spider

Hoplopholcus labyrinthi is a cellar spider species found in Crete.

== See also ==
- List of Pholcidae species
