= Semljicola barbiger =

Scientific classification
- Kingdom: Animalia
- Phylum: Arthropoda
- Subphylum: Chelicerata
- Class: Arachnida
- Order: Araneae
- Infraorder: Araneomorphae
- Family: Linyphiidae
- Genus: Semljicola
- Species: S. barbiger

Binomial name
- Semljicola barbiger (L. Koch, 1879)

Species of spider

Semljicola barbiger is a spider species found in Sweden, Finland, Russia and Kazakhstan.
