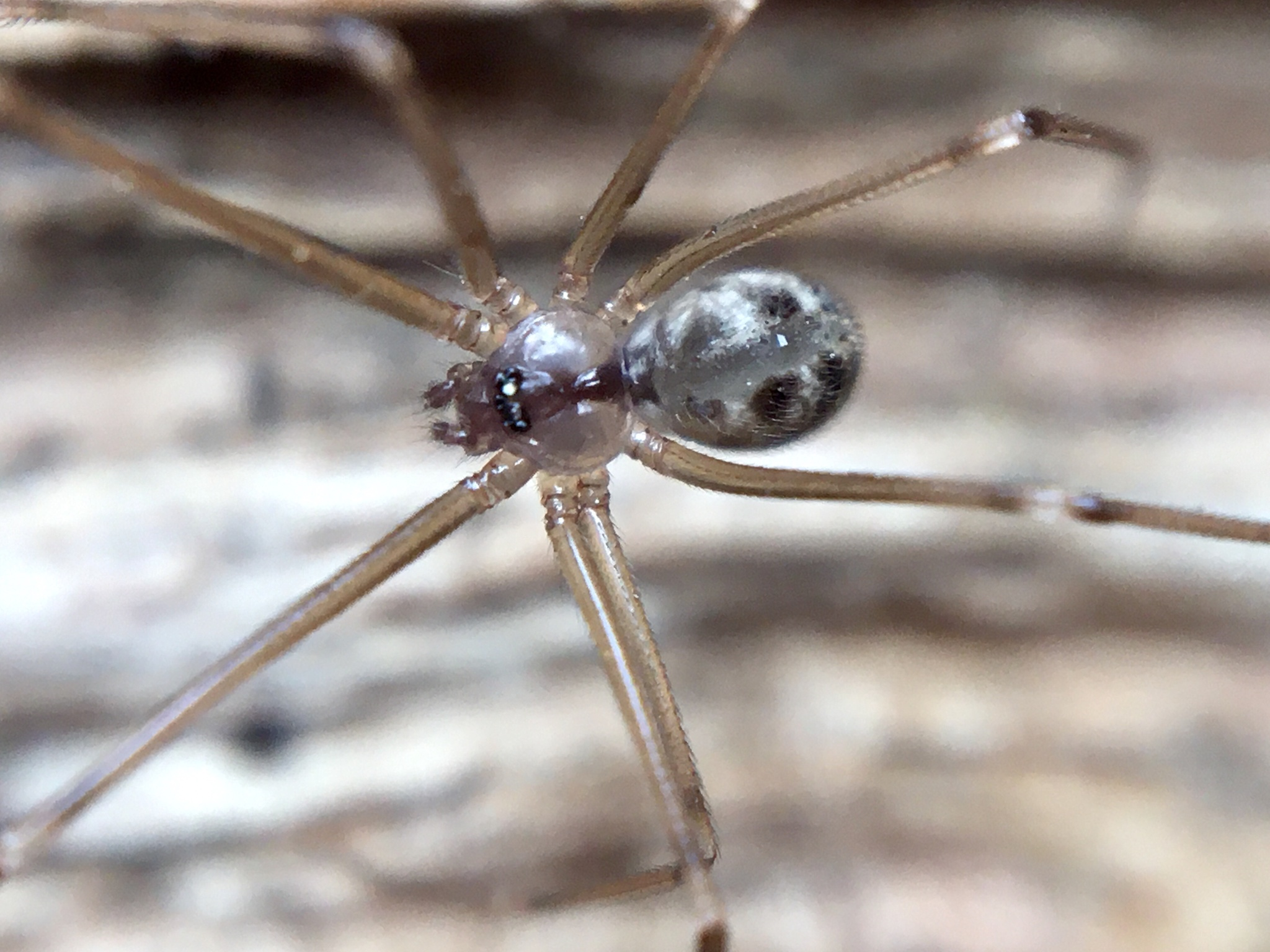

Scientific classification
- Domain: Eukaryota
- Kingdom: Animalia
- Phylum: Arthropoda
- Subphylum: Chelicerata
- Class: Arachnida
- Order: Araneae
- Infraorder: Araneomorphae
- Family: Pholcidae
- Genus: Hoplopholcus
- Species: H. forskali

Binomial name
- Hoplopholcus forskali (Thorell, 1871)

= Hoplopholcus forskali =

Species of spider

Hoplopholcus forskali is a cellar spider species found from Eastern Europe to Turkmenistan.

== See also ==
- List of Pholcidae species
