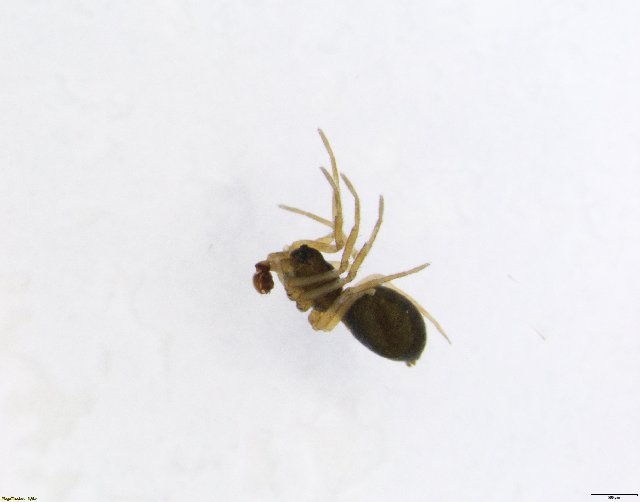

Scientific classification
- Kingdom: Animalia
- Phylum: Arthropoda
- Subphylum: Chelicerata
- Class: Arachnida
- Order: Araneae
- Infraorder: Araneomorphae
- Family: Linyphiidae
- Genus: Semljicola
- Species: S. alticola

Binomial name
- Semljicola alticola (Holm, 1950)

Synonyms
- Rhaebothorax alticola Holm, 1950; Eboria alticola (Holm, 1950); Eboria holmi Eskov, 1981

= Semljicola alticola =

Species of spider

Semljicola alticola is a spider species found in Sweden, Finland and Russia.
