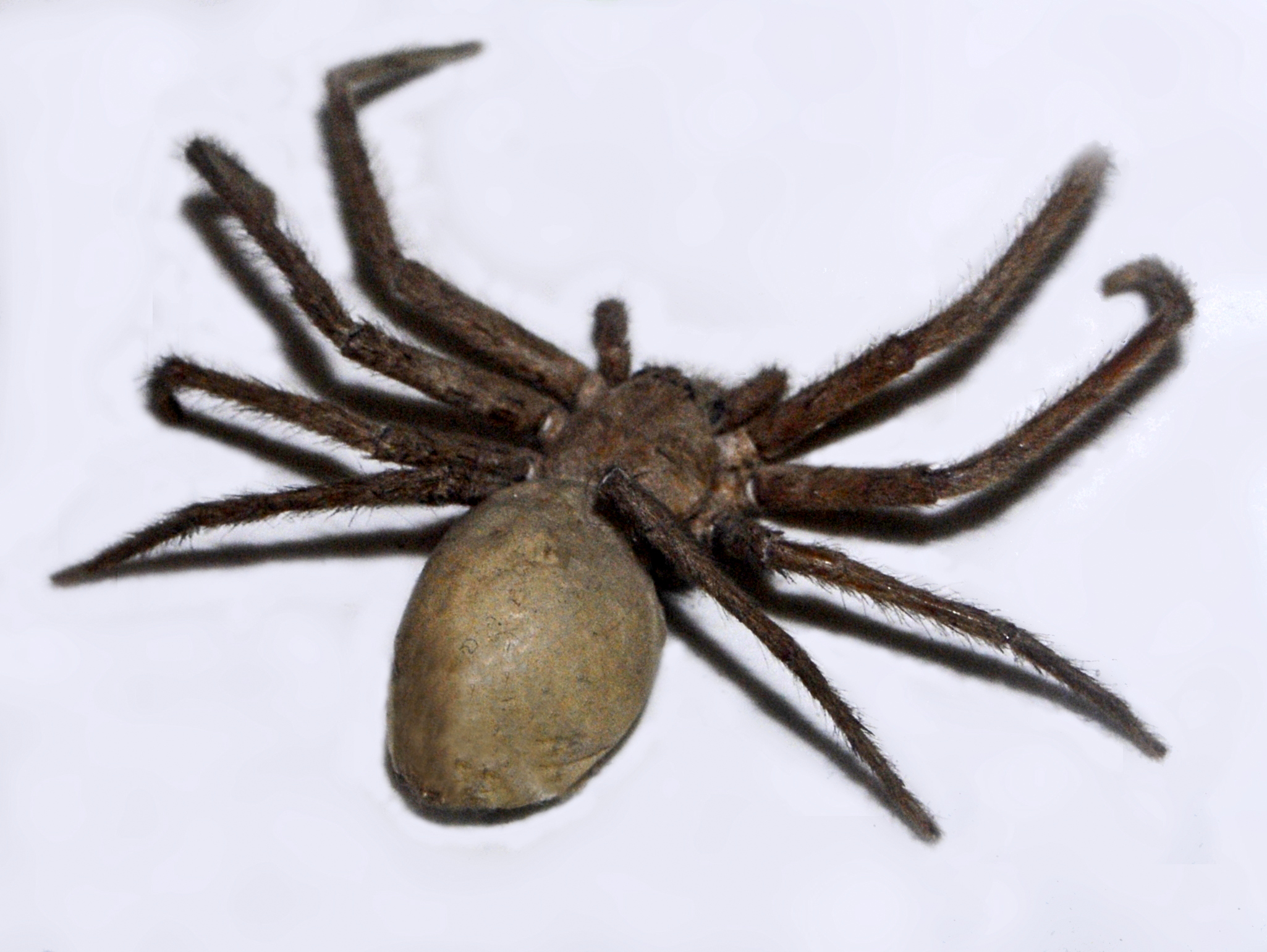
- Museum specimen of Gnathopalystes kochi from Myanmar

Scientific classification
- Kingdom: Animalia
- Phylum: Arthropoda
- Subphylum: Chelicerata
- Class: Arachnida
- Order: Araneae
- Infraorder: Araneomorphae
- Family: Sparassidae
- Genus: Gnathopalystes
- Species: G. kochi

Binomial name
- Gnathopalystes kochi (Simon, 1880)

= Gnathopalystes kochi =

Species of spider

Gnathopalystes kochi is a spider in the family Sparassidae. This species is widespread in India, Myanmar, Malaysia, Java, Sumatra and Borneo.
