= Urocoras munieri =

Scientific classification
- Kingdom: Animalia
- Phylum: Arthropoda
- Subphylum: Chelicerata
- Class: Arachnida
- Order: Araneae
- Infraorder: Araneomorphae
- Family: Agelenidae
- Genus: Urocoras
- Species: U. munieri

Binomial name
- Urocoras munieri (Simon, 1880)

Species of spider

Urocoras munieri is a funnel weaver spider species found in Italy, Slovenia and Croatia.
