= Poeciloneta lyrica =

Scientific classification
- Domain: Eukaryota
- Kingdom: Animalia
- Phylum: Arthropoda
- Subphylum: Chelicerata
- Class: Arachnida
- Order: Araneae
- Infraorder: Araneomorphae
- Family: Linyphiidae
- Genus: Poeciloneta
- Species: P. lyrica

Binomial name
- Poeciloneta lyrica (Zorsch, 1937)

Species of spider

Poeciloneta lyrica is a species of sheetweb spider in the family Linyphiidae. It is found in North America.
