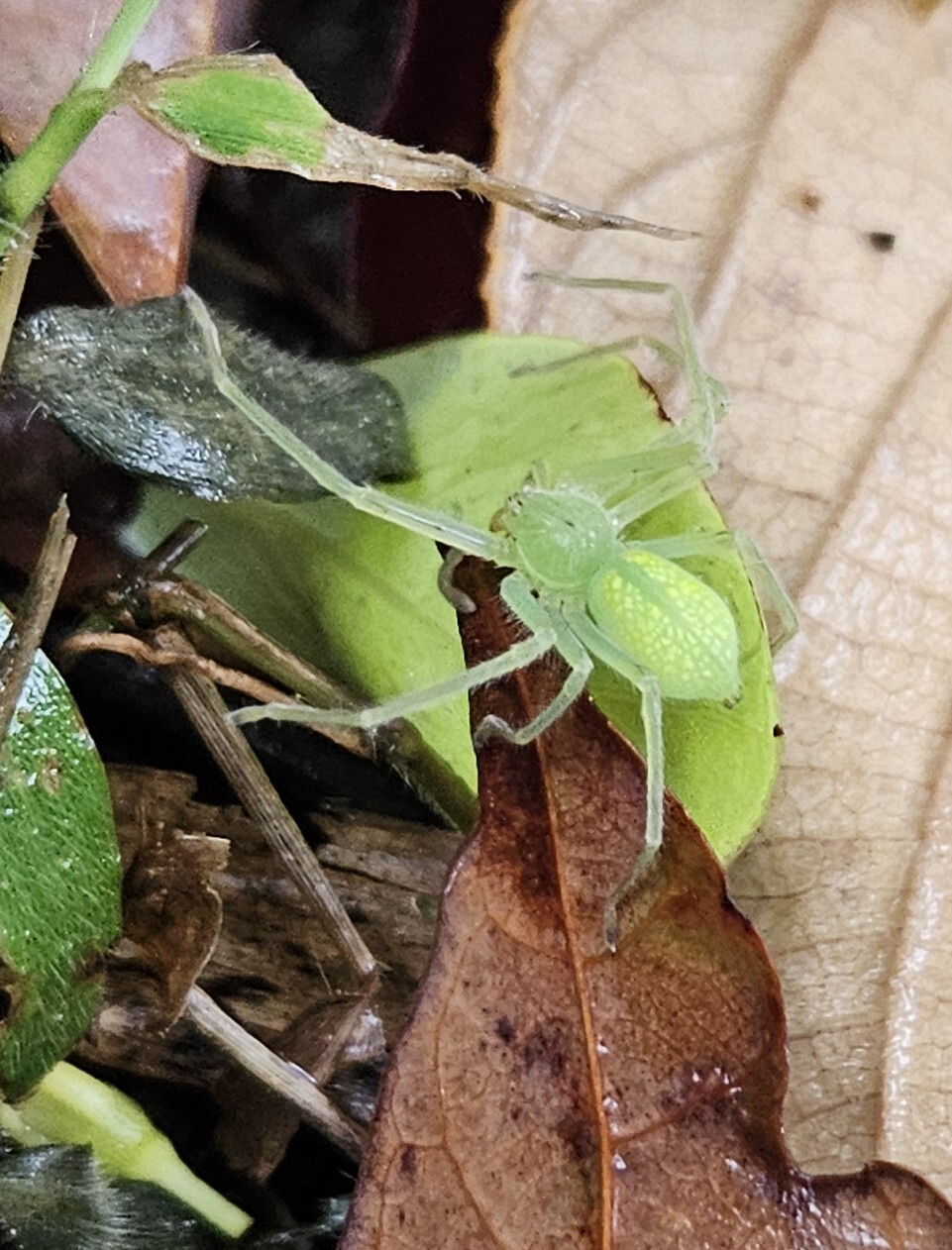

Scientific classification
- Kingdom: Animalia
- Phylum: Arthropoda
- Subphylum: Chelicerata
- Class: Arachnida
- Order: Araneae
- Infraorder: Araneomorphae
- Family: Sparassidae
- Genus: Gnathopalystes
- Species: G. taiwanensis

Binomial name
- Gnathopalystes taiwanensis Zhu & Tso, 2006

= Gnathopalystes taiwanensis =

Species of spider

Gnathopalystes taiwanensis, the tiny green huntsman spider, is a species of huntsman spider endemic to Taiwan.
