= Kikimora =

Slavic mythological creature

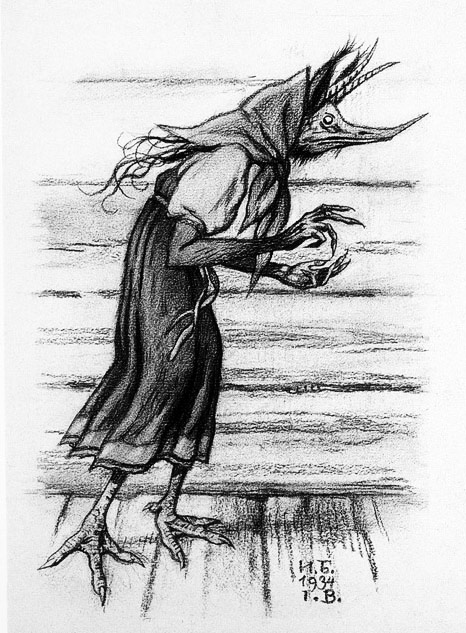
Illustration of a kikimora (1934) by Ivan Bilibin (1876–1942). (Kikimora as house-spirit and guardian of chickens - hence her depiction in chicken-like form).

Kikimora (Note: Russian: кикимора, IPA: [kʲɪˈkʲimərə]; Ukrainian: кікімора; Belarusian: кікімара, romanized: kikimara.) is a legendary creature, a female house spirit in Slavic mythology. Her role in the house is usually juxtaposed with that of the domovoy. The kikimora can either be a "bad" or a "good" spirit, which will depend on the behavior of the homeowner. In more recent times, an image of kikimora as a female swamp spirit has developed.

== Etymology ==
Most sources link the suffix -mora with the Proto-Slavic *morà ('nightly spirit, bad dream') and the Proto-Germanic *marōn (id.), as in the modern English nightmare or French cauchemar.

In Polish folklore, mora are the souls of living people that leave the body during the night, and are seen as wisps of straw or hair or as moths. Accordingly, Polish mora, Czech můra denote both a kind of elf or spirit as well as a "sphinx moth" or "night butterfly". Other Slavic languages with cognates that have the double meaning of moth are: Kashubian mòra, and Slovak mora.

In Slovene, Croatian and Serbian, mora refers to a "nightmare". Mora or Mara is one of the spirits from ancient Slav mythology. Mara was a dark spirit that takes the form of a beautiful woman and then visits men in their dreams, torturing them with desire, and dragging life out of them. In Serbia, a mare is called mora, or noćnik/noćnica ("night creature", masculine and feminine respectively).

== History ==
The origin of the kikimora comes from the 8th to 13th century when Slavic paganism was slowly subsumed by Christianity. However, even after Christianity took hold in the Slavic regions, the belief of the kikimora was still strong. Belief in the entity still continues today where it is imbued with old Slavic folk religion and Christianity's concept of demonic forces.

== Features and behaviours ==
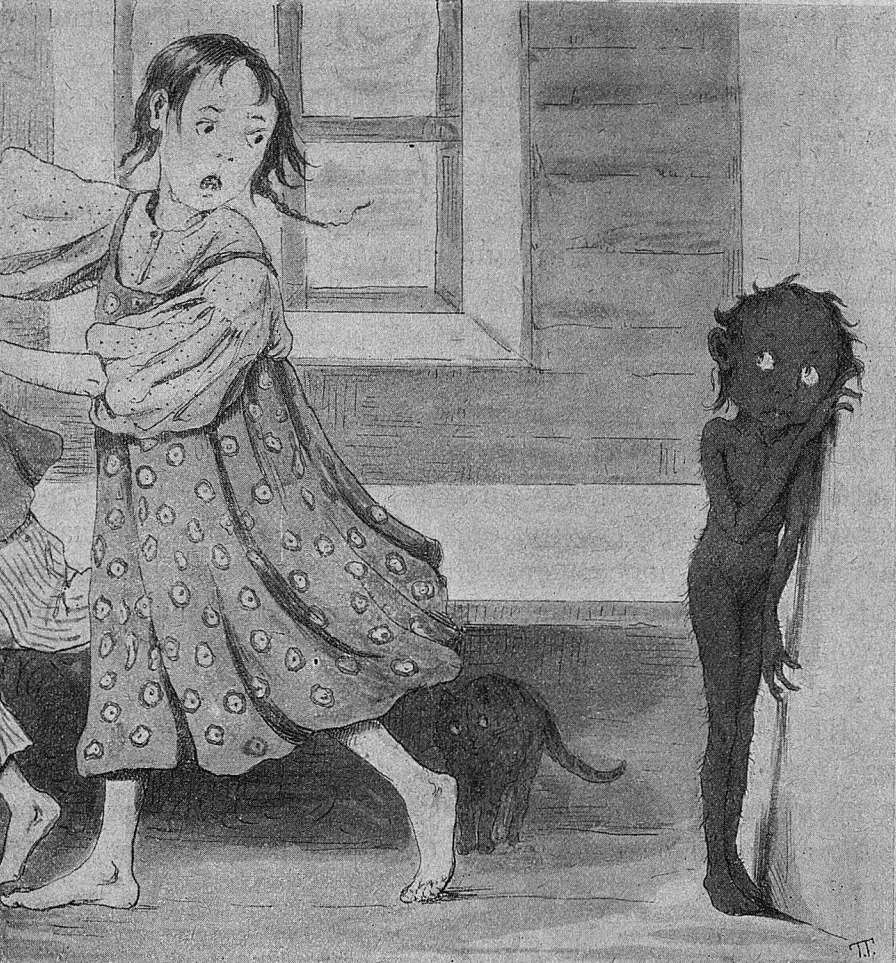
Child frightened by shy (house) Kikimora by Tatiana Nikolaevna Gippius (1877–1957).

The kikimora might have the snout of a dog, a chicken beak or can even resemble a goat-like entity with glowing eyes and horns. In fact, it can take any part of an animal's face or body. It is always feminine and can appear as an old woman or a beautiful girl. She might even appear as a deceased family member.

The swamp kikimora is usually described as a small, ugly, hunchbacked, thin, and scruffy old woman with a pointed nose and disheveled hair. She was said to use moss and grass as clothes. It was believed that she frightens people, knocks travelers off the road or even drowns them. She also kidnaps children.

It is a common belief that a mora enters the room through the keyhole, sits on the chest of the sleepers and tries to strangle them (hence moriti, "to torture", "to bother", "to strangle"). To repel moras, children are advised to look at the window or to turn the pillow and make a sign of cross on it (prekrstiti jastuk); in the early 19th century, Vuk Karadžić mentioned that people would repel moras by leaving a broom upside down behind the door, or putting their belt on top of their sheets, or saying an elaborate prayer poem before they went to sleep.

There are two different kinds of kikimoras. The one that comes from the forest is married to the domovoi. The other one comes from the swamp (Russian: кикимора болотная) and is married to leshy. It is said that she can be identified by her wet footprints. When home builders wanted to cause harm to someone buying a house, they would bring in kikimora. Once she is inside, it is difficult to get her to leave.

There is a Russian bylichka about one swamp kikimora, who loved to brew beer. Her name was Baba Bolotnitsa (Russian: Баба-болотница). When she was brewing beer, fog rose over the river (or swamp).

When the house is in order, a kikimora looks after the chickens and housework. If not, she whistles, breaks dishes, and makes noises at night. She also comes out at night to spin thread.

The concept of the kikimora is thought to serve basic functions and duties of the household. A kikimora would haunt a household if a woman did not keep a clean house, if a husband was lazy or abusive, or if children were poorly disciplined. Reversing one's behaviour is believed to remove her presence from the house. Besides that, the kikimora entity is thought to console or explain tragic events like the death of a family member or the loss of household items.

== Legacy ==
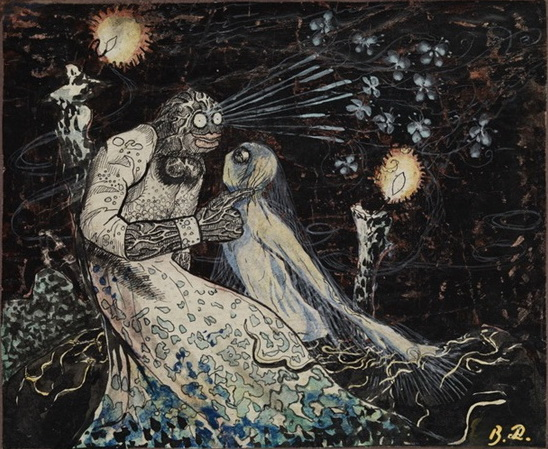
Swamp kikimora (кикимора болотная), after which the spider Kikimora palustris is named. Art work by symbolist painter Vasily Ivanovich Denisov (1862–1922).

The legendary kikimora provides the basis of Kikimora (op. 63), a tone poem for orchestra by Anatoly Lyadov. Lyadov wrote that she "grows up with a magician in the mountains. From dawn to sunset the magician’s cat regales kikimora with fantastic tales of ancient times and faraway places, as kikimora rocks in a cradle made of crystal. It takes her seven years to reach maturity, by which time her head is no larger than a thimble and her body no wider than a strand of straw. Kikimora spins flax from dusk and to dawn, with evil intentions for the world."

Russian "New Age" writer Vladimir Megre mentions the kikimora in The Space of Love, Book 3 of his "Ringing Cedars" series. Megre likens a man who marries unwisely based on looks and fashion to one who marries a kikimora. A footnote in the English version describes the kikimora as a malevolent female ghost said to attach itself to a particular house and disturb the inhabitants, males in particular. By extension, the term may also suggest an ugly woman in shabby clothing, ill-tempered and grumbling, striving to make the life of her husband (and men in general) unbearable.

In 1988, Kirill Eskov discovered and described a new genus and species of sheetweaver spider, Kikimora palustris, named after this spirit.

The 2015 video game The Witcher 3: Wild Hunt and 2019 television series The Witcher both include depictions of kikimory, which are spider-like monsters that have no relation to folkloric kikimoras.

In the 2021 movie The Last Warrior: Emissary of Darkness multiple kikimoras serve minor roles to the plot.

A unrelated character named Kikimora in Disney's television series The Owl House shares the same name.

The 2025 movie Ballerina From The World of John Wick describes the myth of a kikimora to the young protagonist.

== See also ==
- Bolotnik – Slavic spirit of the marshes and tutelary deity
- Brownie – Household spirit in Scottish folklore
- Granny Squannit – Mythological figure in Wampanoag folklore
- Lares – Guardian deities in ancient Roman religion
