= Kikimora palustris =

Scientific classification
- Kingdom: Animalia
- Phylum: Arthropoda
- Subphylum: Chelicerata
- Class: Arachnida
- Order: Araneae
- Infraorder: Araneomorphae
- Family: Linyphiidae
- Genus: Kikimora; Eskov, 1988
- Species: K. palustris

Binomial name
- Kikimora palustris Eskov, 1988

Genus of spiders

Kikimora is a monotypic genus of dwarf spiders containing the single species, Kikimora palustris. It was first described by K. Y. Eskov in 1988, and has only been found in Finland, Norway, and Russia.

== Derivation of name ==
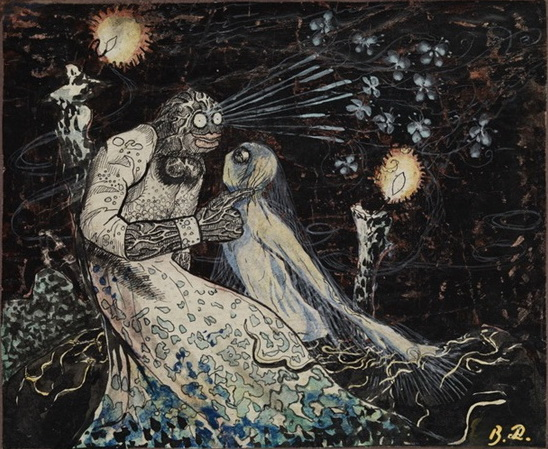
The Russian swamp-goblin Kikimora after whom is named the spider Kikimora palustris. Art work by symbolist painter Vasiliy Ivanovich Denisov (1862-1922).

When Eskov discovered this genus of sheetweaver spiders he used for it the name of the Russian bogeywoman (and personification of nightmare and sleep paralysis) Kikimora - specifically the type of Kikimora imagined to inhabit swamps (in further reference to the specific name palustris "of the marsh") and to be married to the forest-spirit Leshy.

== See also ==
- Kikimora
- Domovoy
- Folklore of Russia
