= Władysław Kulczyński =

Polish arachnologist

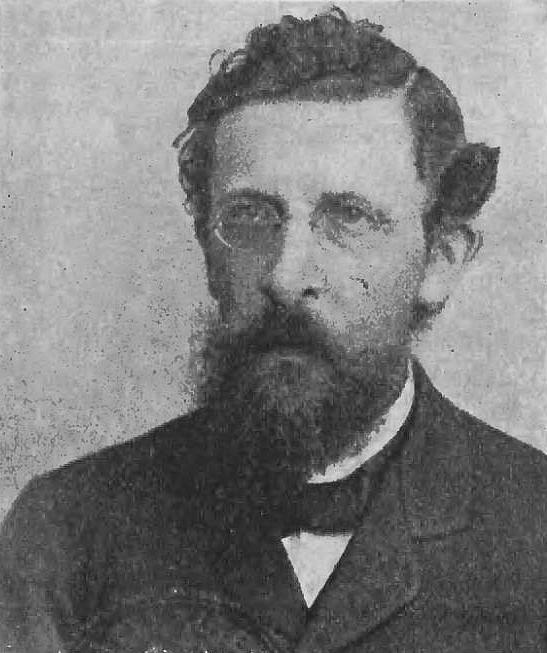
- Born: 27 March 1854; Kraków
- Died: 9 December 1919 (aged 65); Kraków
- Scientific career
- Fields: Arachnology
- Author abbrev. (zoology): Kulczyński

Władysław Kulczyński (27 March 1854, Kraków – 9 December 1919, Kraków) was a Polish zoologist who specialised in arachnology.

== Biography ==
Kulczyński was born in Kraków and went to school at the St. Anne's Gymnasium before joining the Jagiellonian University. He was a student of Maksimilian Nowicki and in 1879 he became a teacher in a secondary school, working for 30 years. He worked at St. Anne's Gymnasium from 1877 to 1888 and until 1912 at the St. Jacek's Gymnasium. While working as a teacher he worked on the fauna of Poland in collaboration with Jan Jachna. He also taught at the agricultural college of the Jagiellonian University from 1890. He received an honorary doctorate in 1906 and habilitated in 1909 and in 1919 he became a professor at the Jagiellonian University. In 1877 he was a member of the Physiographic Commission and served as a curator of the zoology collections after the death of Konstanty Jelski in 1897. He collected spider specimens across the region and received others from a network of contacts. Along with Chryzer he produced a two volume work on the spiders of Hungary Araneae Hungariae (1895-96).

== Works ==
- Kulczyński, Władysław (1975). Collected papers on spiders of Wladyslaw Kulczyński. Springer Netherlands. ISBN 978-94-017-5824-6.
