= Kirill Yeskov =

Russian writer, biologist and paleontologist

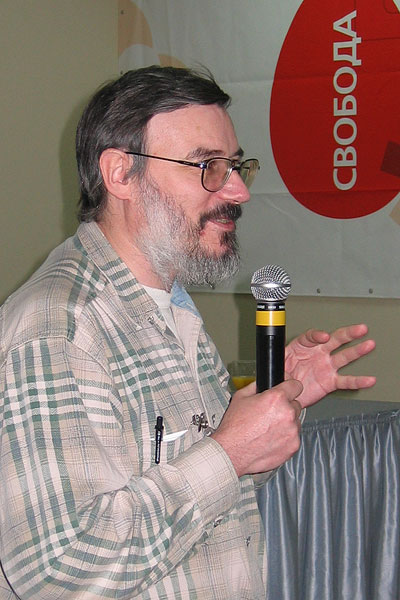
Kirill Yeskov in 2006

Kirill Yuryevich Yeskov (Russian: Кирилл Юрьевич Еськов; born 16 September 1956, Moscow), also transliterated Kiril Eskov, is a Russian writer, biologist and paleontologist. As an author he is known for The Gospel of Afranius in which he presents an atheistic interpretation of the events of the Gospel, and The Last Ringbearer in which he retells J. R. R. Tolkien's The Lord of the Rings from a Mordorian point of view.

== Career ==
=== In biology ===
Yeskov graduated from the Department of Biology of Moscow State University in 1979. In 1986 he defended a dissertation for the Candidate of Biological Sciences at the A.N. Severtsov Institute of Animal Evolutionary Morphology and Ecology of the USSR Academy of Sciences, the theme being "Spiders of Northern Siberia (horology analysis)". His main scientific interests as a biologist focus on the spiders of Siberia and the Russian Far East and, as a paleontologist, on the Paleozoic and Cenozoic eras. As of 2008 he is the Senior Researcher at the Laboratory of Arthropods of the Paleontological Institute of Russian Academy of Sciences and vice-president of the Eurasian Arachnological Society. He has worked at the institute since 1988. As of 2002 he had 86 scientific publications.

Yeskov has discovered several new genera of spiders. Among seven that he discovered in 1988 is Kikimora palustris Eskov, 1988 It belongs to the family Linyphiidae, and is found in Russia and Finland. The name translates from Latin as "marsh Kikimora". (Kikimora is a female spirit in Slavic mythology and the Russian phrase кикимора болотная (kikimora bolotnaya, "marsh kikimora") is well known in the Russian language.) He has named a genus of linyphiid spiders Sauron after the Tolkien character.

He is the author of the book History of the Earth and its lifeforms (Russian: Удивительная палеонтология: История Земли и жизни на ней, Moscow, 2008), intended as a biology textbook for high schools.

In recent years, Yeskov has been working on phylogeny of trapdoor spiders and evolution of trichobothria in spiders in general.

=== As an author ===
As a fiction writer, Yeskov has published several books, one of the best-known being The Last Ringbearer (Russian: Последний кольценосец), an alternative retelling of (or sequel to) J. R. R. Tolkien's The Lord of the Rings, as told from the point of view of Sauron's forces in light of the proverb "History is written by the victors." The book was "published to acclaim" in his homeland in 1999. Translations of the book have also appeared in other European nations, but fear of the vigilant and litigious Tolkien estate has heretofore prevented its publication in English." In late 2010, however, an English translation approved by Yeskov was posted on LiveJournal. The American journalist Laura Miller characterised The Last Ringbearer as "a well-written, energetic adventure yarn that offers an intriguing gloss on what some critics have described as the overly simplistic morality of Tolkien's masterpiece."

Other books by Yeskov include The Gospel of Afranius (Russian: Евангелие от Афрания), a dramatic portrayal of Jesus. In this work he presents a demythologised account of the events of the Gospels.

== Selected scientific publications ==
- Eskov, K.Y. (1988). "Seven new monotypic genera of spiders of the family Linyphiidae (Aranei) from Siberia". Zool. Zh. 67 (5): 678–690.
- Eskov, K.Y. (1993). "Several new linyphiid spider genera (Araneida, Linyphiidae) from the Russian Far East". Arthropoda Selecta. 2 (3): 43–60.
