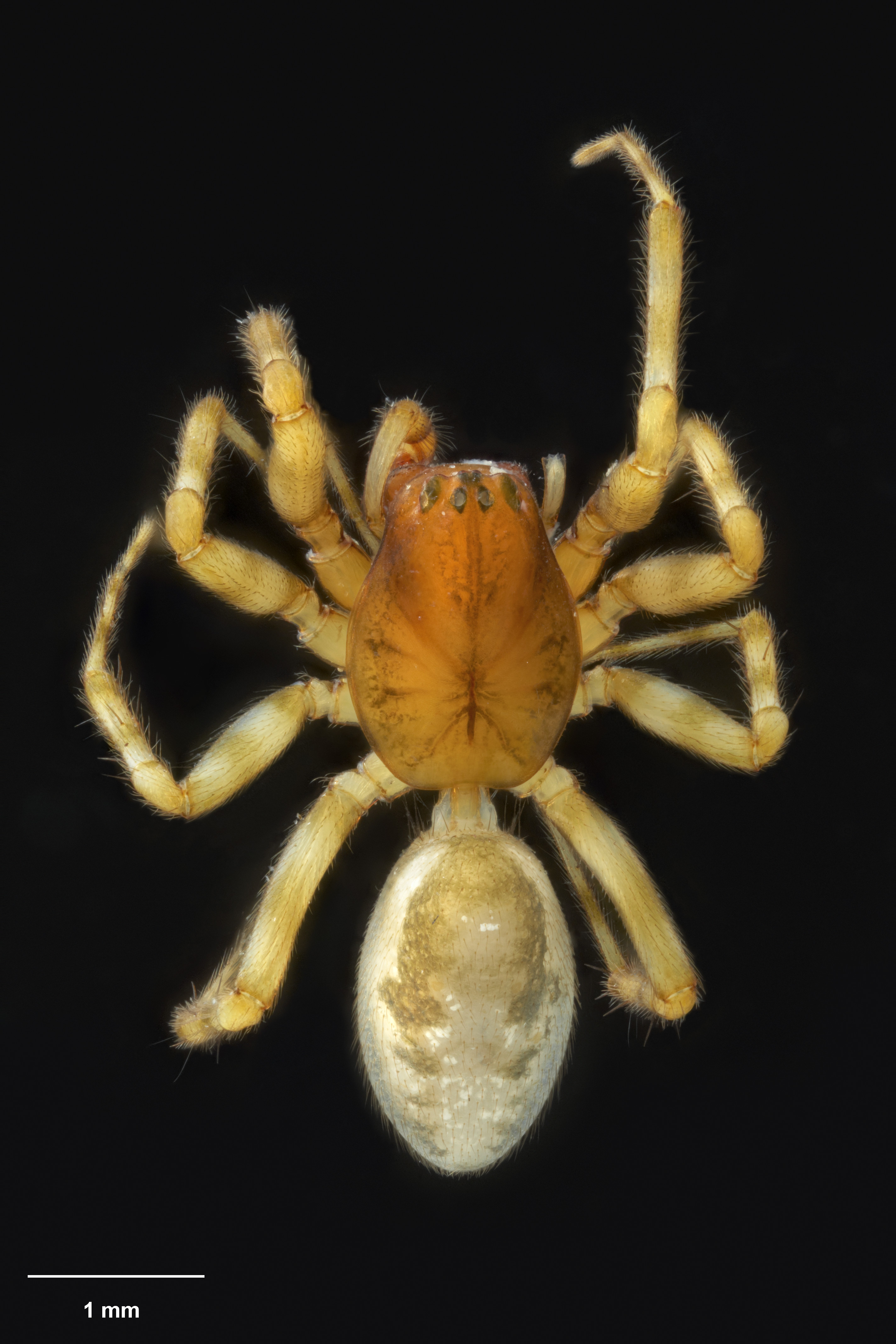
- Holotype of Metafroneta subversa held at Te Papa, Wellington

Scientific classification
- Kingdom: Animalia
- Phylum: Arthropoda
- Subphylum: Chelicerata
- Class: Arachnida
- Order: Araneae
- Infraorder: Araneomorphae
- Family: Linyphiidae
- Genus: Metafroneta; Blest, 1979

Type species
- M. sinuosa Blest, 1979

Species
- 3, see text

= Metafroneta =

Genus of spiders

Metafroneta is a genus of South Pacific dwarf spiders that was first described by A. D. Blest in 1979.

== Species ==
As of May 2021 it contains three species:

- Metafroneta minima Blest, 1979 – New Zealand
- Metafroneta sinuosa Blest, 1979 (type) – New Zealand
- Metafroneta subversa Blest & Vink, 2002 – New Zealand
