= Metafroneta sinuosa =

Conservation status
- Naturally Uncommon (NZ TCS)

Scientific classification
- Domain: Eukaryota
- Kingdom: Animalia
- Phylum: Arthropoda
- Subphylum: Chelicerata
- Class: Arachnida
- Order: Araneae
- Infraorder: Araneomorphae
- Family: Linyphiidae
- Genus: Metafroneta
- Species: M. sinuosa

Binomial name
- Metafroneta sinuosa Blest, 1979

Species of spider

Metafroneta sinuosa is a species of sheet weaver spider endemic to New Zealand.

== Taxonomy ==
This species was described in 2002 by A.D Blest and Cor Vink from male and female specimens. The holotype is stored in Otago Museum.

== Description ==
The male is recorded at 3.42mm in length whereas the female is 4.42mm. This species has a brown cephalothorax and yellow brown legs.

== Distribution ==
This species is only known from Dunedin and Fiordland in New Zealand.

== Conservation status ==
Under the New Zealand Threat Classification System, this species is listed as "Naturally Uncommon" with the qualifier of "Range Restricted".
