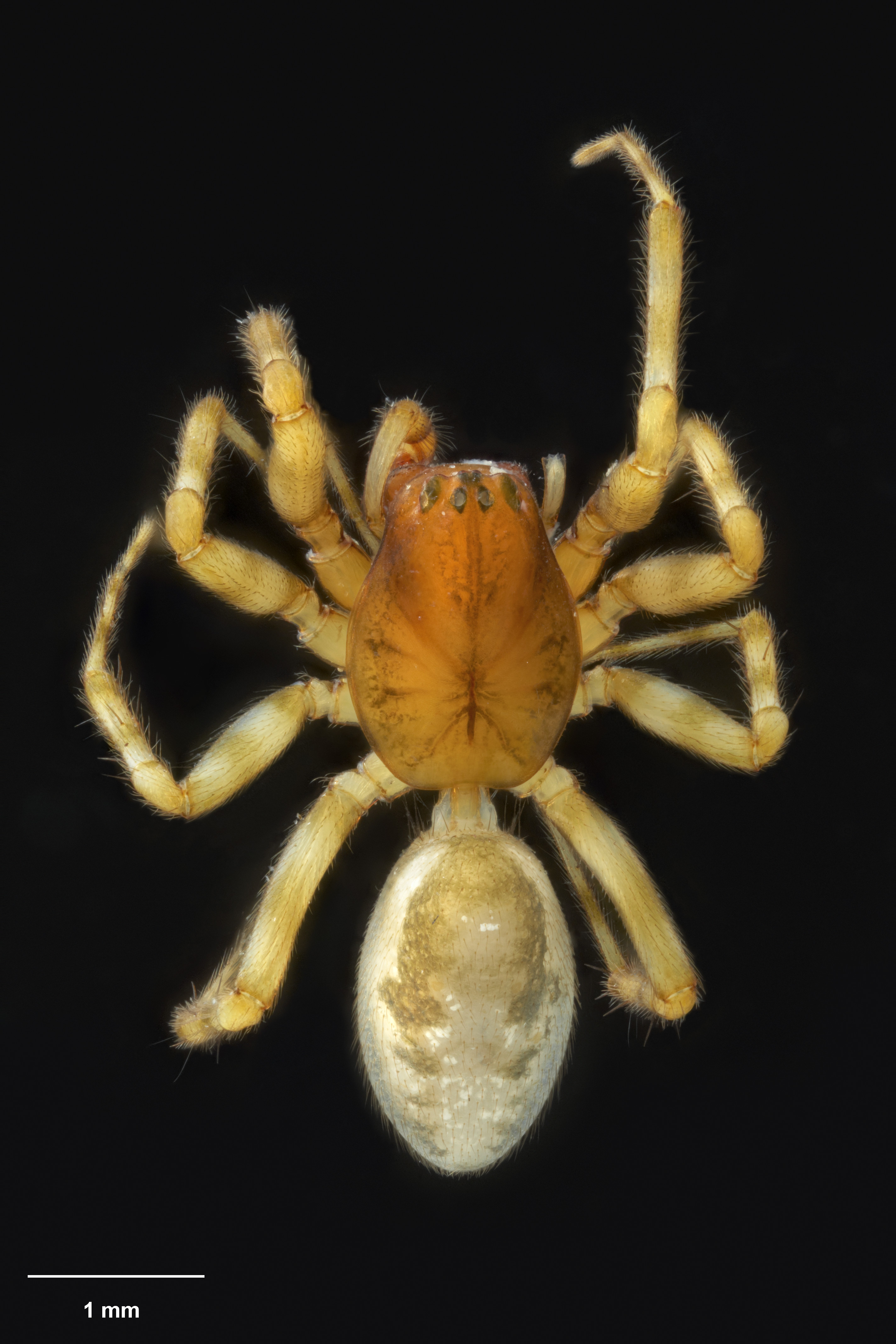

Conservation status
- Not Threatened (NZ TCS)

Scientific classification
- Domain: Eukaryota
- Kingdom: Animalia
- Phylum: Arthropoda
- Subphylum: Chelicerata
- Class: Arachnida
- Order: Araneae
- Infraorder: Araneomorphae
- Family: Linyphiidae
- Genus: Metafroneta
- Species: M. subversa

Binomial name
- Metafroneta subversa Blest & Vink, 2002

= Metafroneta subversa =

Species of spider

Metafroneta subversa is a species of sheet weaver spider endemic to New Zealand.

== Taxonomy ==
This species was described in 2002 by A.D Blest and Cor Vink from male and female specimens. The holotype is stored in Te Papa Museum under registration number AS.000724.

== Description ==
The male is recorded at 3.88mm in length whereas the female is 4.13mm. This species has a brown prosoma and brown legs. The abdomen is dark grey.

== Distribution ==
This species is only known from the South Island in New Zealand.

== Conservation status ==
Under the New Zealand Threat Classification System, this species is listed as "Not Threatened".
