= Protoerigone =

Scientific classification
- Kingdom: Animalia
- Phylum: Arthropoda
- Subphylum: Chelicerata
- Class: Arachnida
- Order: Araneae
- Infraorder: Araneomorphae
- Family: Linyphiidae
- Genus: Protoerigone; Blest, 1979

Type species
- P. otagoa Blest, 1979

Species
- 2, see text

Genus of spiders

Protoerigone is a genus of Polynesian sheet weavers that was first described by A. D. Blest in 1979.

== Species ==
As of May 2019 it contains only two species:

- Protoerigone obtusa Blest, 1979 – New Zealand
- Protoerigone otagoa Blest, 1979 (type) – New Zealand
