= Poecilafroneta =

Conservation status
- Data Deficit (NZ TCS)

Scientific classification
- Kingdom: Animalia
- Phylum: Arthropoda
- Subphylum: Chelicerata
- Class: Arachnida
- Order: Araneae
- Infraorder: Araneomorphae
- Family: Linyphiidae
- Genus: Poecilafroneta; Blest, 1979
- Species: P. caudata

Binomial name
- Poecilafroneta caudata Blest, 1979

Genus of spiders

Poecilafroneta is a monotypic genus of Polynesian sheet weavers containing the single species, Poecilafroneta caudata. It was first described by A. D. Blest in 1979, and has only been found in New Zealand.

== Taxonomy ==
This species was described in 1979 by A.D Blest from male and female specimens. The holotype is stored in Otago Museum.

== Description ==
The male is recorded at 2.92mm in length whereas the female is 2.6mm. This species has a brown cephalothorax and pale yellow legs with black markings. The abdomen is grey with pale and dark markings.

== Distribution ==
This species is only known from Nelson, New Zealand.

== Conservation status ==
Under the New Zealand Threat Classification System, this species is listed as "Data Deficient" with the qualifiers of "Data Poor: Size" and "Data Poor: Trend".
