= Neodietrichia =

Scientific classification
- Kingdom: Animalia
- Phylum: Arthropoda
- Subphylum: Chelicerata
- Class: Arachnida
- Order: Araneae
- Infraorder: Araneomorphae
- Family: Linyphiidae
- Genus: Neodietrichia; Özdikmen, 2008
- Species: N. hesperia

Binomial name
- Neodietrichia hesperia (Crosby & Bishop, 1933)

Genus of spiders

Neodietrichia is a monotypic genus of North American dwarf spiders containing the single species, Neodietrichia hesperia. It was first described by H. Özdikmen in 2008, and has only been found in Canada and the United States.
