= Kratochviliella =

Scientific classification
- Kingdom: Animalia
- Phylum: Arthropoda
- Subphylum: Chelicerata
- Class: Arachnida
- Order: Araneae
- Infraorder: Araneomorphae
- Family: Linyphiidae
- Genus: Kratochviliella; Miller, 1938
- Species: K. bicapitata

Binomial name
- Kratochviliella bicapitata Miller, 1938

Genus of spiders

Kratochviliella is a monotypic genus of dwarf spiders containing the single species, Kratochviliella bicapitata. It was first described by F. Miller in 1938, and has only been found in Bulgaria, France, Greece, and Macedonia.
