= Intecymbium =

Scientific classification
- Kingdom: Animalia
- Phylum: Arthropoda
- Subphylum: Chelicerata
- Class: Arachnida
- Order: Araneae
- Infraorder: Araneomorphae
- Family: Linyphiidae
- Genus: Intecymbium; Miller, 2007
- Species: I. antarcticum

Binomial name
- Intecymbium antarcticum (Simon, 1895)

Genus of spiders

Intecymbium is a monotypic genus of South American dwarf spiders containing the single species, Intecymbium antarcticum. It was first described by J. A. Miller in 2007, and has only been found in Argentina and Chile.
