= Labullula =

Scientific classification
- Kingdom: Animalia
- Phylum: Arthropoda
- Subphylum: Chelicerata
- Class: Arachnida
- Order: Araneae
- Infraorder: Araneomorphae
- Family: Linyphiidae
- Genus: Labullula; Strand, 1913
- Species: L. annulipes

Binomial name
- Labullula annulipes Strand, 1913

Genus of spiders

Labullula is a monotypic genus of African dwarf spiders containing the single species, Labullula annulipes. It was first described by Embrik Strand in 1913, and has only been found in Angola, Cameroon, and Comoros.
