= Exechopsis =

Scientific classification
- Kingdom: Animalia
- Phylum: Arthropoda
- Subphylum: Chelicerata
- Class: Arachnida
- Order: Araneae
- Infraorder: Araneomorphae
- Family: Linyphiidae
- Genus: Exechopsis; Millidge, 1991

Type species
- E. versicolor Millidge, 1991

Species
- E. conspicua Millidge, 1991 – Peru, Brazil; E. eberhardi Rodrigues, Lemos & Brescovit, 2013 – Brazil; E. versicolor Millidge, 1991 – Colombia, Ecuador

Genus of spiders

Exechopsis is a genus of South American dwarf spiders that was first described by Alfred Frank Millidge in 1991. As of May 2019 it contains only three species: E. conspicua, E. eberhardi, and E. versicolor.
