= Dolabritor =

Scientific classification
- Kingdom: Animalia
- Phylum: Arthropoda
- Subphylum: Chelicerata
- Class: Arachnida
- Order: Araneae
- Infraorder: Araneomorphae
- Family: Linyphiidae
- Genus: Dolabritor; Millidge, 1991

Type species
- D. spineus Millidge, 1991

Species
- D. ascifer Millidge, 1991 – Colombia; D. spineus Millidge, 1991 – Colombia

Genus of spiders

Dolabritor is a genus of South American dwarf spiders that was first described by Alfred Frank Millidge in 1991. As of May 2019 it contains only two species, both found in Colombia: D. ascifer and D. spineus.
