= Chiangmaia =

Scientific classification
- Kingdom: Animalia
- Phylum: Arthropoda
- Subphylum: Chelicerata
- Class: Arachnida
- Order: Araneae
- Infraorder: Araneomorphae
- Family: Linyphiidae
- Genus: Chiangmaia; Millidge, 1995

Type species
- C. sawetamali Millidge, 1995

Species
- C. rufula Millidge, 1995 – Thailand; C. sawetamali Millidge, 1995 – Thailand

Genus of spiders

Chiangmaia is a genus of Southeast Asian dwarf spiders that was first described by Alfred Frank Millidge in 1995. As of May 2019 it contains only two species, both found in Thailand: C. rufula and C. sawetamali.
