= Onychembolus =

Scientific classification
- Kingdom: Animalia
- Phylum: Arthropoda
- Subphylum: Chelicerata
- Class: Arachnida
- Order: Araneae
- Infraorder: Araneomorphae
- Family: Linyphiidae
- Genus: Onychembolus; Millidge, 1985

Type species
- O. subalpinus Millidge, 1985

Species
- 2, see text

Genus of spiders

Onychembolus is a genus of South American dwarf spiders that was first described by Alfred Frank Millidge in 1985.

== Species ==
As of May 2019 it contains two species:

- Onychembolus anceps Millidge, 1991 – Chile
- Onychembolus subalpinus Millidge, 1985 (type) – Chile, Argentina
