= Catonetria =

Scientific classification
- Kingdom: Animalia
- Phylum: Arthropoda
- Subphylum: Chelicerata
- Class: Arachnida
- Order: Araneae
- Infraorder: Araneomorphae
- Family: Linyphiidae
- Genus: Catonetria; Millidge & Ashmole, 1994
- Species: C. caeca

Binomial name
- Catonetria caeca Millidge & Ashmole, 1994

Genus of spiders

Catonetria is a monotypic genus of dwarf spiders containing the single species, Catonetria caeca. It was first described by Alfred Frank Millidge & N. P. Ashmole in 1994, and has only been found on Ascension Island.
