= Lygarina =

Scientific classification
- Kingdom: Animalia
- Phylum: Arthropoda
- Subphylum: Chelicerata
- Class: Arachnida
- Order: Araneae
- Infraorder: Araneomorphae
- Family: Linyphiidae
- Genus: Lygarina; Simon, 1894

Type species
- L. nitida Simon, 1894

Species
- 5, see text

Synonyms
- Millidgefa Özdikmen, 2007; Notiothauma Millidge, 1991

Genus of spiders

Lygarina is a genus of South American dwarf spiders that was first described by Eugène Louis Simon in 1894.

== Species ==
As of May 2019 it contains five species, found in Argentina, Brazil, Peru, and Venezuela:

- Lygarina aurantiaca (Simon, 1905) – Argentina
- Lygarina caracasana Simon, 1894 – Venezuela
- Lygarina finitima Millidge, 1991 – Peru
- Lygarina nitida Simon, 1894 (type) – Brazil
- Lygarina silvicola Millidge, 1991 – Brazil
