= Novafrontina =

Scientific classification
- Kingdom: Animalia
- Phylum: Arthropoda
- Subphylum: Chelicerata
- Class: Arachnida
- Order: Araneae
- Infraorder: Araneomorphae
- Family: Linyphiidae
- Genus: Novafrontina; Millidge, 1991

Type species
- N. bipunctata (Keyserling, 1886)

Species
- 3, see text

Genus of spiders

Novafrontina is a genus of dwarf spiders that was first described by Alfred Frank Millidge in 1991.

== Species ==
As of May 2019 it contains three species:

- Novafrontina bipunctata (Keyserling, 1886) (type) – Ecuador, Peru
- Novafrontina patens Millidge, 1991 – Colombia
- Novafrontina uncata (F. O. Pickard-Cambridge, 1902) – Mexico to Brazil
