= Chthiononetes =

Scientific classification
- Kingdom: Animalia
- Phylum: Arthropoda
- Subphylum: Chelicerata
- Class: Arachnida
- Order: Araneae
- Infraorder: Araneomorphae
- Family: Linyphiidae
- Genus: Chthiononetes; Millidge, 1993
- Species: C. tenuis

Binomial name
- Chthiononetes tenuis Millidge, 1993

Genus of spiders

Chthiononetes is a monotypic genus of Australian dwarf spiders containing the single species, Chthiononetes tenuis. It was first described by Alfred Frank Millidge in 1993, and has only been found in Australia.
