= Hypselocara =

Scientific classification
- Kingdom: Animalia
- Phylum: Arthropoda
- Subphylum: Chelicerata
- Class: Arachnida
- Order: Araneae
- Infraorder: Araneomorphae
- Family: Linyphiidae
- Genus: Hypselocara; Millidge, 1991
- Species: H. altissimum

Binomial name
- Hypselocara altissimum (Simon, 1894)

Genus of spiders

Hypselocara is a monotypic genus of South American dwarf spiders containing the single species, Hypselocara altissimum. It was first described by Alfred Frank Millidge in 1991, and has only been found in Venezuela.
