= Masikia =

Scientific classification
- Kingdom: Animalia
- Phylum: Arthropoda
- Subphylum: Chelicerata
- Class: Arachnida
- Order: Araneae
- Infraorder: Araneomorphae
- Family: Linyphiidae
- Genus: Masikia; Millidge, 1984

Type species
- M. indistincta (Kulczyński, 1908)

Species
- 4, see text

Genus of spiders

Masikia is a genus of dwarf spiders that was first described by Alfred Frank Millidge in 1984.

== Species ==
As of May 2019 it contains four species, found in Canada, Russia, and the United States:

- Masikia bizini Nekhaeva, Marusik & Buckle, 2019 – Russia (north-east Siberia)
- Masikia caliginosa Millidge, 1984 – Russia (Europe to Far North-East, Kurile Is.), USA (Alaska)
- Masikia indistincta (Kulczyński, 1908) (type) – Russia (Europe to Far North-East), Canada
- Masikia relicta (Chamberlin, 1949) – USA
