= Ctenophysis =

Scientific classification
- Kingdom: Animalia
- Phylum: Arthropoda
- Subphylum: Chelicerata
- Class: Arachnida
- Order: Araneae
- Infraorder: Araneomorphae
- Family: Linyphiidae
- Genus: Ctenophysis; Millidge, 1985
- Species: C. chilensis

Binomial name
- Ctenophysis chilensis Millidge, 1985

Genus of spiders

Ctenophysis is a monotypic genus of South American dwarf spiders containing the single species Ctenophysis chilensis. It was first described by Alfred Frank Millidge in 1985, and has only been found in Chile.
