= Plectembolus =

Scientific classification
- Kingdom: Animalia
- Phylum: Arthropoda
- Subphylum: Chelicerata
- Class: Arachnida
- Order: Araneae
- Infraorder: Araneomorphae
- Family: Linyphiidae
- Genus: Plectembolus; Millidge & Russell-Smith, 1992

Type species
- P. quadriflectus Millidge & Russell-Smith, 1992

Species
- 5, see text

Genus of spiders

Plectembolus is a genus of Southeast Asian sheet weavers that was first described by Alfred Frank Millidge & A. Russell-Smith in 1992.

== Species ==
As of May 2019 it contains five species, found in Indonesia, Malaysia, the Philippines, and on the Sumatra:

- Plectembolus biflectus Millidge & Russell-Smith, 1992 – Philippines
- Plectembolus quadriflectus Millidge & Russell-Smith, 1992 (type) – Malaysia (mainland), Indonesia (Sumatra)
- Plectembolus quinqueflectus Millidge & Russell-Smith, 1992 – Malaysia, Indonesia (Sumatra)
- Plectembolus similis Millidge & Russell-Smith, 1992 – Indonesia (Sumatra)
- Plectembolus triflectus Millidge & Russell-Smith, 1992 – Malaysia
