= Bactrogyna =

Scientific classification
- Kingdom: Animalia
- Phylum: Arthropoda
- Subphylum: Chelicerata
- Class: Arachnida
- Order: Araneae
- Infraorder: Araneomorphae
- Family: Linyphiidae
- Genus: Bactrogyna; Millidge, 1991
- Species: B. prominens

Binomial name
- Bactrogyna prominens Millidge, 1991

Genus of spiders

Bactrogyna is a monotypic genus of South American dwarf spiders containing the single species, Bactrogyna prominens. It was first described by Alfred Frank Millidge in 1991, and has only been found in Chile.
