= Dendronetria =

Scientific classification
- Kingdom: Animalia
- Phylum: Arthropoda
- Subphylum: Chelicerata
- Class: Arachnida
- Order: Araneae
- Infraorder: Araneomorphae
- Family: Linyphiidae
- Genus: Dendronetria; Millidge & Russell-Smith, 1992

Type species
- D. obscura Millidge & Russell-Smith, 1992

Species
- D. humilis Millidge & Russell-Smith, 1992 – Borneo; D. obscura Millidge & Russell-Smith, 1992 – Borneo

Genus of spiders

Dendronetria is a genus of Indonesian dwarf spiders that was first described by Alfred Frank Millidge & A. Russell-Smith in 1992. As of May 2019, it contained only two species, both found in Borneo: D. humilis and D. obscura.
