= Nentwigia =

Scientific classification
- Kingdom: Animalia
- Phylum: Arthropoda
- Subphylum: Chelicerata
- Class: Arachnida
- Order: Araneae
- Infraorder: Araneomorphae
- Family: Linyphiidae
- Genus: Nentwigia; Millidge, 1995
- Species: N. diffusa

Binomial name
- Nentwigia diffusa Millidge, 1995

Genus of spiders

Nentwigia is a monotypic genus of Southeast Asian dwarf spiders containing the single species, Nentwigia diffusa. Nentwigia is a genus of spiders in the family sheetweb weavers. It was first described by Alfred Frank Millidge in 1995, and has only been found in Indonesia and Thailand.
