= Psilocymbium =

Scientific classification
- Kingdom: Animalia
- Phylum: Arthropoda
- Subphylum: Chelicerata
- Class: Arachnida
- Order: Araneae
- Infraorder: Araneomorphae
- Family: Linyphiidae
- Genus: Psilocymbium; Millidge, 1991

Type species
- P. tuberosum Millidge, 1991

Species
- 7, see text

Synonyms
- Gilvonanus Millidge, 1991

Genus of spiders

Psilocymbium is a genus of South American sheet weavers that was first described by Alfred Frank Millidge in 1991.

== Species ==
As of May 2019 it contains seven species, found in Colombia, Peru, Brazil, and Argentina:

- Psilocymbium acanthodes Miller, 2007 – Argentina
- Psilocymbium antonina Rodrigues & Ott, 2010 – Brazil
- Psilocymbium defloccatum (Keyserling, 1886) – Peru
- Psilocymbium incertum Millidge, 1991 – Colombia
- Psilocymbium lineatum (Millidge, 1991) – Brazil, Argentina
- Psilocymbium pilifrons Millidge, 1991 – Colombia
- Psilocymbium tuberosum Millidge, 1991 (type) – Brazil
