= Locketina =

Scientific classification
- Kingdom: Animalia
- Phylum: Arthropoda
- Subphylum: Chelicerata
- Class: Arachnida
- Order: Araneae
- Infraorder: Araneomorphae
- Family: Linyphiidae
- Genus: Locketina; Kocak & Kemal, 2006

Type species
- L. versa (Locket, 1982)

Species
- L. fissivulva (Millidge & Russell-Smith, 1992) – Borneo; L. pusilla (Millidge & Russell-Smith, 1992) – Borneo; L. versa (Locket, 1982) – Malaysia

Genus of spiders

Locketina is a genus of Southeast Asian dwarf spiders that was first described by A. O. Kocak & M. Kemal in 2006. As of May 2019 it contains only three species, found in Indonesia and Malaysia: L. fissivulva, L. pusilla, and L. versa.
