= Anodoration =

Scientific classification
- Kingdom: Animalia
- Phylum: Arthropoda
- Subphylum: Chelicerata
- Class: Arachnida
- Order: Araneae
- Infraorder: Araneomorphae
- Family: Linyphiidae
- Genus: Anodoration; Millidge, 1991

Type species
- A. claviferum Millidge, 1991

Species
- A. claviferum Millidge, 1991 – Brazil, Argentina; A. tantillum (Millidge, 1991) – Brazil

Genus of spiders

Anodoration is a genus of South American dwarf spiders that was first described by Alfred Frank Millidge in 1991. As of May 2019 it contains only two species: A. claviferum and A. tantillum.
