= Cyphonetria =

Scientific classification
- Kingdom: Animalia
- Phylum: Arthropoda
- Subphylum: Chelicerata
- Class: Arachnida
- Order: Araneae
- Infraorder: Araneomorphae
- Family: Linyphiidae
- Genus: Cyphonetria; Millidge, 1995
- Species: C. thaia

Binomial name
- Cyphonetria thaia Millidge, 1995

Genus of spiders

Cyphonetria is a monotypic genus of Southeast Asian dwarf spiders containing the single species, Cyphonetria thaia. It was first described by Alfred Frank Millidge in 1995, and has only been found in Thailand.
