= Moyosi =

Scientific classification
- Kingdom: Animalia
- Phylum: Arthropoda
- Subphylum: Chelicerata
- Class: Arachnida
- Order: Araneae
- Infraorder: Araneomorphae
- Family: Linyphiidae
- Genus: Moyosi; Miller, 2007

Type species
- M. prativaga (Keyserling, 1886)

Species
- 3, see text

Genus of spiders

Moyosi is a genus of South American dwarf spiders that was first described by J. A. Miller in 2007.

== Species ==
As of May 2019 it contains three species:

- Moyosi chumota Miller, 2007 – Guyana
- Moyosi prativaga (Keyserling, 1886) (type) – Brazil, Argentina
- Moyosi rugosa (Millidge, 1991) – Argentina
