= Caenonetria =

Scientific classification
- Kingdom: Animalia
- Phylum: Arthropoda
- Subphylum: Chelicerata
- Class: Arachnida
- Order: Araneae
- Infraorder: Araneomorphae
- Family: Linyphiidae
- Genus: Caenonetria; Millidge & Russell-Smith, 1992
- Species: C. perdita

Binomial name
- Caenonetria perdita Millidge & Russell-Smith, 1992

Genus of spiders

Caenonetria is a monotypic genus of Indonesian dwarf spiders containing the single species, Caenonetria perdita. It was first described by Alfred Frank Millidge & A. Russell-Smith in 1992, and has only been found in Indonesia.
