= Blestia =

Scientific classification
- Kingdom: Animalia
- Phylum: Arthropoda
- Subphylum: Chelicerata
- Class: Arachnida
- Order: Araneae
- Infraorder: Araneomorphae
- Family: Linyphiidae
- Genus: Blestia; Millidge, 1993
- Species: B. sarcocuon

Binomial name
- Blestia sarcocuon (Crosby & Bishop, 1927)

Genus of spiders

Blestia is a monotypic genus of North American dwarf spiders containing the single species, Blestia sarcocuon. It was first described by Alfred Frank Millidge in 1993, and has only been found in United States.

B. sarcocuon is unique in that the males possess a horizontal groove on the clypeus situated beneath the eyes. This groove is actually a pair of sulci, separated in the middle by a ridge of integument. The floor of each sulcus features irregularly-shaped clusters of small pores; the function of these pores, which may or may not be sexual in nature, is currently unknown.
