= Microplanus =

Scientific classification
- Kingdom: Animalia
- Phylum: Arthropoda
- Subphylum: Chelicerata
- Class: Arachnida
- Order: Araneae
- Infraorder: Araneomorphae
- Family: Linyphiidae
- Genus: Microplanus; Millidge, 1991

Type species
- M. mollis Millidge, 1991

Species
- 2, see text

Genus of spiders

Microplanus is a genus of dwarf spiders that was first described by Alfred Frank Millidge in 1991.

== Species ==
As of May 2019 it contains two species:

- Microplanus mollis Millidge, 1991 (type) – Colombia
- Microplanus odin Miller, 2007 – Panama
