= Eurymorion =

Scientific classification
- Kingdom: Animalia
- Phylum: Arthropoda
- Subphylum: Chelicerata
- Class: Arachnida
- Order: Araneae
- Infraorder: Araneomorphae
- Family: Linyphiidae
- Genus: Eurymorion; Millidge, 1993

Type species
- E. insigne (Millidge, 1991)

Species
- 5, see text

Genus of spiders

Eurymorion is a genus of South American dwarf spiders that was first described by Norman I. Platnick in 1993.

== Species ==
As of May 2019 it contains five species:

- Eurymorion insigne (Millidge, 1991) (type) – Brazil
- Eurymorion mourai Rodrigues & Ott, 2010 – Brazil
- Eurymorion murici Rodrigues & Ott, 2010 – Brazil
- Eurymorion nobile (Millidge, 1991) – Brazil
- Eurymorion triunfo Rodrigues & Ott, 2010 – Bolivia, Brazil
