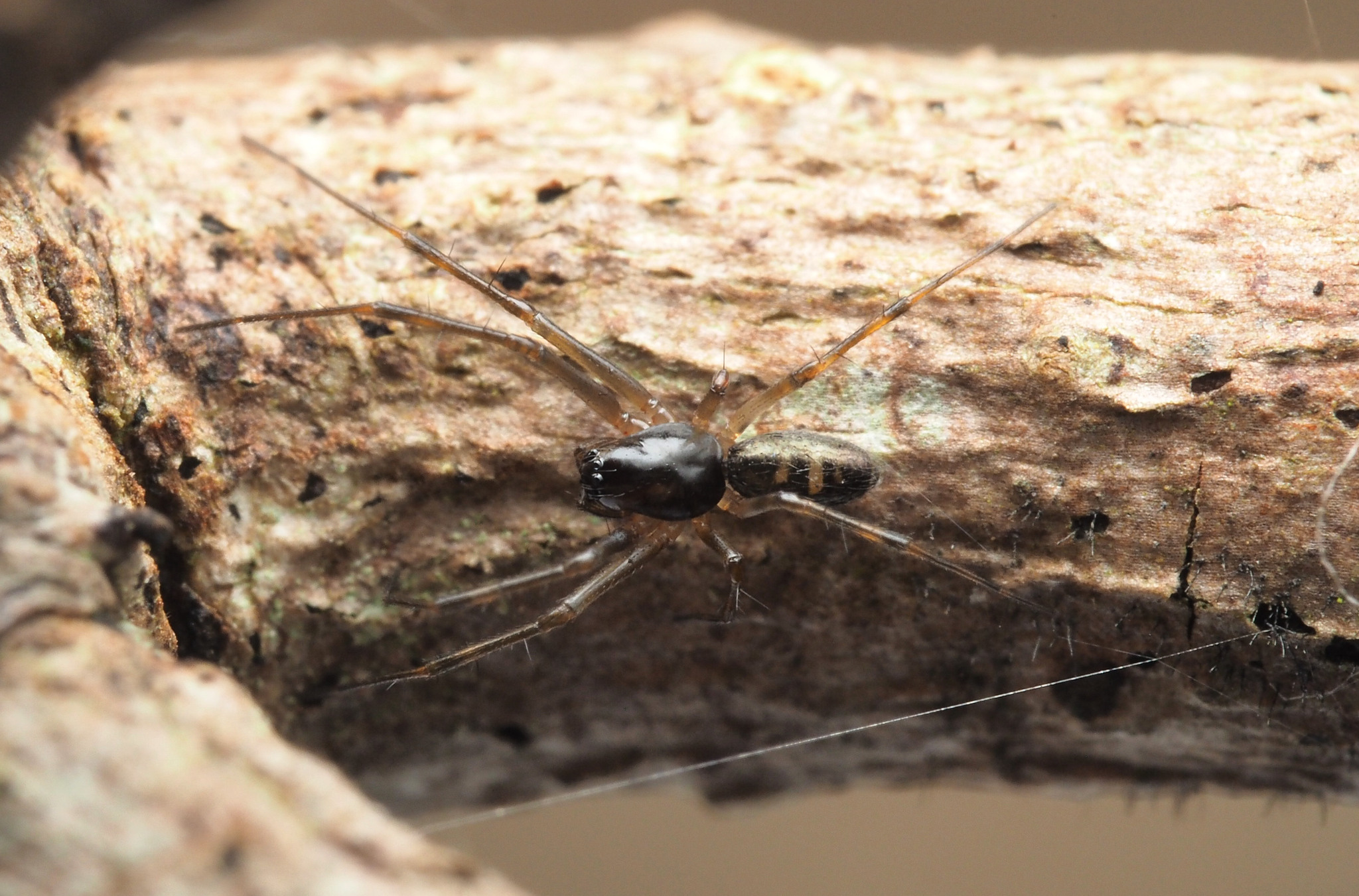

Scientific classification
- Kingdom: Animalia
- Phylum: Arthropoda
- Subphylum: Chelicerata
- Class: Arachnida
- Order: Araneae
- Infraorder: Araneomorphae
- Family: Linyphiidae
- Genus: Palaeohyphantes; Millidge, 1984
- Species: P. simplicipalpis

Binomial name
- Palaeohyphantes simplicipalpis (Wunderlich, 1976)

= Palaeohyphantes =

Palaeohyphantes simplicipalpis

Genus of spiders

Palaeohyphantes is a monotypic genus of dwarf spiders containing the single species, Palaeohyphantes simplicipalpis. It was first described by Alfred Frank Millidge in 1984, and has only been found in Australia.
