= Malkinola =

Scientific classification
- Kingdom: Animalia
- Phylum: Arthropoda
- Subphylum: Chelicerata
- Class: Arachnida
- Order: Araneae
- Infraorder: Araneomorphae
- Family: Linyphiidae
- Genus: Malkinola; Miller, 2007
- Species: M. insulanus

Binomial name
- Malkinola insulanus (Millidge, 1991)

Genus of spiders

Malkinola is a monotypic genus of South American dwarf spiders containing the single species, Malkinola insulanus. It was first described by J. A. Miller in 2007, and has only been found in Chile.
