= Kenocymbium =

Scientific classification
- Kingdom: Animalia
- Phylum: Arthropoda
- Subphylum: Chelicerata
- Class: Arachnida
- Order: Araneae
- Infraorder: Araneomorphae
- Family: Linyphiidae
- Genus: Kenocymbium; Millidge & Russell-Smith, 1992

Type species
- K. deelemanae Millidge & Russell-Smith, 1992

Species
- K. deelemanae Millidge & Russell-Smith, 1992 – Malaysia (mainland), Indonesia (Sumatra); K. simile Millidge & Russell-Smith, 1992 – Thailand

Genus of spiders

Kenocymbium is a genus of Southeast Asian dwarf spiders that was first described by Alfred Frank Millidge & A. Russell-Smith in 1992. As of May 2019 it contains only two species, both found in Indonesia, Malaysia, and Thailand: K. deelemanae and K. simile.
