= Cryptolinyphia =

Scientific classification
- Kingdom: Animalia
- Phylum: Arthropoda
- Subphylum: Chelicerata
- Class: Arachnida
- Order: Araneae
- Infraorder: Araneomorphae
- Family: Linyphiidae
- Genus: Cryptolinyphia; Millidge, 1991
- Species: C. sola

Binomial name
- Cryptolinyphia sola Millidge, 1991

Genus of spiders

Cryptolinyphia is a monotypic genus of South American dwarf spiders containing the single species, Cryptolinyphia sola. It was first described by Alfred Frank Millidge in 1991, and has only been found in Colombia.
