= Fissiscapus =

Scientific classification
- Kingdom: Animalia
- Phylum: Arthropoda
- Subphylum: Chelicerata
- Class: Arachnida
- Order: Araneae
- Infraorder: Araneomorphae
- Family: Linyphiidae
- Genus: Fissiscapus; Millidge, 1991

Type species
- F. pusillus Millidge, 1991

Species
- F. attercop Miller, 2007 – Ecuador; F. fractus Millidge, 1991 – Colombia; F. pusillus Millidge, 1991 – Colombia

Genus of spiders

Fissiscapus is a genus of South American dwarf spiders that was first described by Alfred Frank Millidge in 1991. As of May 2019, it contains only three species, all found in Colombia and Ecuador: F. attercop, F. fractus, and F. pusillus.
