= Gravipalpus =

Scientific classification
- Kingdom: Animalia
- Phylum: Arthropoda
- Subphylum: Chelicerata
- Class: Arachnida
- Order: Araneae
- Infraorder: Araneomorphae
- Family: Linyphiidae
- Genus: Gravipalpus; Millidge, 1991

Type species
- G. callosus Millidge, 1991

Species
- G. callosus Millidge, 1991 – Brazil; G. crassus Millidge, 1991 – Peru; G. standifer Miller, 2007 – Argentina

Genus of spiders

Gravipalpus is a genus of South American dwarf spiders that was first described by Alfred Frank Millidge in 1991. As of May 2019 it contains only three species, found in Argentina, Brazil, and Peru: G. callosus, G. crassus, and G. standifer.
