= Gonatoraphis =

Scientific classification
- Kingdom: Animalia
- Phylum: Arthropoda
- Subphylum: Chelicerata
- Class: Arachnida
- Order: Araneae
- Infraorder: Araneomorphae
- Family: Linyphiidae
- Genus: Gonatoraphis; Millidge, 1991

Type species
- G. lobata Millidge, 1991

Species
- G. aenea Millidge, 1991 – Colombia; G. lobata Millidge, 1991 – Colombia; G. lysistrata Miller, 2007 – Colombia

Genus of spiders

Gonatoraphis is a genus of South American dwarf spiders that was first described by Alfred Frank Millidge in 1991. As of May 2019 it contains only three species, found in Colombia: G. aenea, G. lobata, and G. lysistrata.
