= Locketiella =

Scientific classification
- Kingdom: Animalia
- Phylum: Arthropoda
- Subphylum: Chelicerata
- Class: Arachnida
- Order: Araneae
- Infraorder: Araneomorphae
- Family: Linyphiidae
- Genus: Locketiella; Millidge & Russell-Smith, 1992

Type species
- L. parva Millidge & Russell-Smith, 1992

Species
- L. merretti Millidge, 1995 – Indonesia (Krakatau); L. parva Millidge & Russell-Smith, 1992 – Borneo

Genus of spiders

Locketiella is a genus of Southeast Asian dwarf spiders that was first described by Alfred Frank Millidge & A. Russell-Smith in 1992. As of May 2019 it contains only two species, both found in Indonesia: L. merretti and L. parva.
