= Juanfernandezia =

Scientific classification
- Kingdom: Animalia
- Phylum: Arthropoda
- Subphylum: Chelicerata
- Class: Arachnida
- Order: Araneae
- Infraorder: Araneomorphae
- Family: Linyphiidae
- Genus: Juanfernandezia; Koçak & Kemal, 2008
- Species: J. melanocephala

Binomial name
- Juanfernandezia melanocephala (Millidge, 1991)

Genus of spiders

Juanfernandezia is a monotypic genus of South American dwarf spiders containing the single species, Juanfernandezia melanocephala. It was first described by A. Ö. Koçak & M. Kemal in 2008, and has only been found in Chile.
