= Jacksonella =

Scientific classification
- Kingdom: Animalia
- Phylum: Arthropoda
- Subphylum: Chelicerata
- Class: Arachnida
- Order: Araneae
- Infraorder: Araneomorphae
- Family: Linyphiidae
- Genus: Jacksonella; Millidge, 1951

Type species
- J. falconeri (Jackson, 1908)

Species
- J. bidens Tanasevitch, 2011 – Greece (Samos), Cyprus; J. falconeri (Jackson, 1908) – Europe; J. sexoculata Paik & Yaginuma, 1969 – Korea

Genus of spiders

Jacksonella is a genus of dwarf spiders that was first described by Alfred Frank Millidge in 1951. As of May 2019 it contains only three species, found in Cyprus, Greece, and Korea: J. bidens, J. falconeri, and J. sexoculata.
