= Metapanamomops =

Scientific classification
- Kingdom: Animalia
- Phylum: Arthropoda
- Subphylum: Chelicerata
- Class: Arachnida
- Order: Araneae
- Infraorder: Araneomorphae
- Family: Linyphiidae
- Genus: Metapanamomops; Millidge, 1977
- Species: M. kaestneri

Binomial name
- Metapanamomops kaestneri (Wiehle, 1961)

Genus of spiders

Metapanamomops is a monotypic genus of European dwarf spiders containing the single species, Metapanamomops kaestneri. It was first described by Alfred Frank Millidge in 1977, and has only been found in Germany and Ukraine.
