= Patagoneta =

Scientific classification
- Kingdom: Animalia
- Phylum: Arthropoda
- Subphylum: Chelicerata
- Class: Arachnida
- Order: Araneae
- Infraorder: Araneomorphae
- Family: Linyphiidae
- Genus: Patagoneta; Millidge, 1985
- Species: P. antarctica

Binomial name
- Patagoneta antarctica (Tullgren, 1901)

Genus of spiders

Patagoneta is a monotypic genus of South American dwarf spiders containing the single species, Patagoneta antarctica. It was first described by Alfred Frank Millidge in 1985, and has only been found in Chile.
