= Millidgella =

Scientific classification
- Kingdom: Animalia
- Phylum: Arthropoda
- Subphylum: Chelicerata
- Class: Arachnida
- Order: Araneae
- Infraorder: Araneomorphae
- Family: Linyphiidae
- Genus: Millidgella; Kammerer, 2006
- Species: M. trisetosa

Binomial name
- Millidgella trisetosa (Millidge, 1985)

Genus of spiders

Millidgella is a monotypic genus of South American dwarf spiders containing the single species, Millidgella trisetosa. It was first described by C. F. Kammerer in 2006, and has only been found in Argentina and Chile.
