= Diplothyron =

Scientific classification
- Kingdom: Animalia
- Phylum: Arthropoda
- Subphylum: Chelicerata
- Class: Arachnida
- Order: Araneae
- Infraorder: Araneomorphae
- Family: Linyphiidae
- Genus: Diplothyron; Millidge, 1991

Type species
- Diplothyron fuscus Millidge, 1991

Species
- 12, see text

Genus of spiders

Diplothyron is a genus of South American dwarf spiders. It was first described by Alfred Frank Millidge in 1991.

== Species ==
As of February 2023, it contains twelve species:

- Diplothyron ballesterosi Silva-Moreira & Hormiga, 2022 — Mexico
- Diplothyron chiapasius (Gertsch & Davis, 1946) — Mexico, Honduras
- Diplothyron dianae Silva-Moreira & Hormiga, 2022 — Costa Rica, Panama
- Diplothyron fuscus Millidge, 1991 (type) — Mexico, Costa Rica, Panama, Colombia, Venezuela
- Diplothyron linguatulus (F. O. Pickard-Cambridge, 1902) — Mexico, Guatemala
- Diplothyron monteverde Silva-Moreira & Hormiga, 2022 — Costa Rica
- Diplothyron nigritus (F. O. Pickard-Cambridge, 1902) — Mexico, Guatemala, Nicaragua, Costa Rica, Panama
- Diplothyron nubilosus Silva-Moreira & Hormiga, 2022 — Costa Rica, Panama
- Diplothyron sandrae Silva-Moreira & Hormiga, 2022 — Costa Rica
- Diplothyron simplicata (F. O. Pickard-Cambridge, 1902) — Guatemala, Costa Rica, Panama
- Diplothyron solitarius Silva-Moreira & Hormiga, 2022 — Guatemala
- Diplothyron trifalcatus (F. O. Pickard-Cambridge, 1902) — Mexico, Guatemala, Nicaragua, Costa Rica, Panama
