= Neonesiotes =

Scientific classification
- Kingdom: Animalia
- Phylum: Arthropoda
- Subphylum: Chelicerata
- Class: Arachnida
- Order: Araneae
- Infraorder: Araneomorphae
- Family: Linyphiidae
- Genus: Neonesiotes; Millidge, 1991

Type species
- N. remiformis Millidge, 1991

Species
- 2, see text

Genus of spiders

Neonesiotes is a genus of dwarf spiders that was first described by J. A. Beatty, J. W. Berry & Alfred Frank Millidge in 1991.

== Species ==
As of May 2019 it contains two species:

- Neonesiotes hamatus Millidge, 1991 – Caroline Is.
- Neonesiotes remiformis Millidge, 1991 (type) – Seychelles, Marshall Is., Caroline Is., Cook Is., Fiji, Samoa, French Polynesia
