= Epiwubana =

Scientific classification
- Kingdom: Animalia
- Phylum: Arthropoda
- Subphylum: Chelicerata
- Class: Arachnida
- Order: Araneae
- Infraorder: Araneomorphae
- Family: Linyphiidae
- Genus: Epiwubana; Millidge, 1991
- Species: E. jucunda

Binomial name
- Epiwubana jucunda Millidge, 1991

Genus of spiders

Epiwubana is a monotypic genus of South American dwarf spiders containing the single species, Epiwubana jucunda. It was first described by Alfred Frank Millidge in 1991, and has only been found in Chile.
