= Plicatiductus =

Scientific classification
- Kingdom: Animalia
- Phylum: Arthropoda
- Subphylum: Chelicerata
- Class: Arachnida
- Order: Araneae
- Infraorder: Araneomorphae
- Family: Linyphiidae
- Genus: Plicatiductus; Millidge & Russell-Smith, 1992
- Species: P. storki

Binomial name
- Plicatiductus storki Millidge & Russell-Smith, 1992

Genus of spiders

Plicatiductus is a monotypic genus of Southeast Asian sheet weavers containing the single species, Plicatiductus storki. It was first described by Alfred Frank Millidge and A. Russell-Smith in 1992, and has only been found in Indonesia and on the Sulawesi.
