= Vermontia =

Scientific classification
- Kingdom: Animalia
- Phylum: Arthropoda
- Subphylum: Chelicerata
- Class: Arachnida
- Order: Araneae
- Infraorder: Araneomorphae
- Family: Linyphiidae
- Genus: Vermontia; Millidge, 1984
- Species: V. thoracica

Binomial name
- Vermontia thoracica (Emerton, 1913)

Genus of spiders

Vermontia is a monotypic genus of sheet weavers containing the single species, Vermontia thoracica. It was first described by Alfred Frank Millidge in 1984, and is found in Canada, the United States, and Russia.
