= Asemostera =

Scientific classification
- Kingdom: Animalia
- Phylum: Arthropoda
- Subphylum: Chelicerata
- Class: Arachnida
- Order: Araneae
- Infraorder: Araneomorphae
- Family: Linyphiidae
- Genus: Asemostera; Simon, 1898

Type species
- A. latithorax (Keyserling, 1886)

Species
- 9, see text

Synonyms
- Asemonetes Millidge, 1991; Caleurema Millidge, 1991; Ochronetria Millidge, 1991; Pelidida Simon, 1898

Genus of spiders

Asemostera is a genus of dwarf spiders that was first described by Eugène Louis Simon in 1898. Originally placed with the family Agelenidae, it was moved to the family Linyphiidae in 1965.

== Species ==
As of May 2019 it contains nine species:

- Asemostera arcana (Millidge, 1991) – Costa Rica to Venezuela
- Asemostera daedalus Miller, 2007 – Costa Rica, Panama, Colombia
- Asemostera dianae Rodrigues & Brescovit, 2012 – Peru
- Asemostera enkidu Miller, 2007 – Colombia, Venezuela
- Asemostera involuta (Millidge, 1991) – Ecuador
- Asemostera janetae Miller, 2007 – Peru, Bolivia, Argentina
- Asemostera latithorax (Keyserling, 1886) (type) – Brazil
- Asemostera pallida (Millidge, 1991) – Peru
- Asemostera tacuapi Rodrigues, 2007 – Brazil
