= Dumoga =

Scientific classification
- Kingdom: Animalia
- Phylum: Arthropoda
- Subphylum: Chelicerata
- Class: Arachnida
- Order: Araneae
- Infraorder: Araneomorphae
- Family: Linyphiidae
- Genus: Dumoga; Millidge & Russell-Smith, 1992

Type species
- D. arboricola Millidge & Russell-Smith, 1992

Species
- D. arboricola Millidge & Russell-Smith, 1992 – Indonesia (Sulawesi); D. buratino Tanasevitch, 2017 – Indonesia (Sumatra); D. complexipalpis Millidge & Russell-Smith, 1992 – Indonesia (Sulawesi)

Genus of spiders

Dumoga is a genus of Southeast Asian dwarf spiders that was first described by Alfred Frank Millidge & A. Russell-Smith in 1992. As of May 2019 it contains only three species: D. arboricola, D. buratino, and D. complexipalpis.
