= Phyllarachne =

Scientific classification
- Kingdom: Animalia
- Phylum: Arthropoda
- Subphylum: Chelicerata
- Class: Arachnida
- Order: Araneae
- Infraorder: Araneomorphae
- Family: Linyphiidae
- Genus: Phyllarachne; Millidge & Russell-Smith, 1992
- Species: P. levicula

Binomial name
- Phyllarachne levicula Millidge & Russell-Smith, 1992

Genus of spiders

Phyllarachne is a monotypic genus of Indonesian dwarf spiders containing the single species, Phyllarachne levicula. It was first described by Alfred Frank Millidge & A. Russell-Smith in 1992, and has only been found on the Borneo.
