= Habreuresis =

Scientific classification
- Kingdom: Animalia
- Phylum: Arthropoda
- Subphylum: Chelicerata
- Class: Arachnida
- Order: Araneae
- Infraorder: Araneomorphae
- Family: Linyphiidae
- Genus: Habreuresis; Millidge, 1991

Type species
- H. falcata Millidge, 1991

Species
- H. falcata Millidge, 1991 – Chile; H. recta Millidge, 1991 – Chile

Genus of spiders

Habreuresis is a genus of South American dwarf spiders that was first described by Alfred Frank Millidge in 1991. As of May 2019 it contains only two species, both found in Chile: H. falcata and H. recta.
