= Adelonetria =

Scientific classification
- Kingdom: Animalia
- Phylum: Arthropoda
- Subphylum: Chelicerata
- Class: Arachnida
- Order: Araneae
- Infraorder: Araneomorphae
- Family: Linyphiidae
- Genus: Adelonetria; Millidge, 1991
- Species: A. dubiosa

Binomial name
- Adelonetria dubiosa Millidge, 1991

Genus of spiders

Adelonetria is a monotypic genus of South American dwarf spiders containing the single species, Adelonetria dubiosa. It was first described by Alfred Frank Millidge in 1991, and has only been found in Chile.
