= Pronasoona =

Scientific classification
- Kingdom: Animalia
- Phylum: Arthropoda
- Subphylum: Chelicerata
- Class: Arachnida
- Order: Araneae
- Infraorder: Araneomorphae
- Family: Linyphiidae
- Genus: Pronasoona; Millidge, 1995

Type species
- P. sylvatica Millidge, 1995

Species
- 2, see text

Genus of spiders

Pronasoona is a genus of Southeast Asian sheet weavers that was first described by Alfred Frank Millidge in 1995.

== Species ==
As of May 2019 it contains two species:

- Pronasoona aurata Millidge, 1995 – Thailand
- Pronasoona sylvatica Millidge, 1995 (type) – Malaysia (Borneo)
