= Ketambea =

Scientific classification
- Kingdom: Animalia
- Phylum: Arthropoda
- Subphylum: Chelicerata
- Class: Arachnida
- Order: Araneae
- Infraorder: Araneomorphae
- Family: Linyphiidae
- Genus: Ketambea; Millidge & Russell-Smith, 1992

Type species
- K. rostrata Millidge & Russell-Smith, 1992

Species
- 9, see text

Genus of spiders

Ketambea is a genus of Asian dwarf spiders that was first described by Alfred Frank Millidge & A. Russell-Smith in 1992.

== Species ==
As of January 2023 it contains nine species, found in China, Indonesia, Japan, Korea, Myanmar, Russia, and Thailand:

- Ketambea acuta Tanasevitch, 2017 – China, Myanmar, Thailand
- Ketambea aseptifera Irfan, Zhang & Peng, 2022 – China
- Ketambea falcata Irfan, Zhang & Peng, 2022 – China
- Ketambea liupanensis (Tang & Song, 1992) – Russia (Far East), China
- Ketambea nigripectoris (Oi, 1960) – Russia (Far East), China, Korea, Japan
- Ketambea permixta Millidge & Russell-Smith, 1992 – Indonesia (Java)
- Ketambea rostrata Millidge & Russell-Smith, 1992 (type) – Indonesia (Sumatra)
- Ketambea septifera Irfan, Zhang & Peng, 2022 – China
- Ketambea vermiformis Millidge & Russell-Smith, 1992 – Indonesia (Java)
