= Solenysa =

Scientific classification
- Kingdom: Animalia
- Phylum: Arthropoda
- Subphylum: Chelicerata
- Class: Arachnida
- Order: Araneae
- Infraorder: Araneomorphae
- Family: Linyphiidae
- Genus: Solenysa; Simon, 1894

Type species
- S. mellotteei Simon, 1894

Species
- 15, see text

Genus of spiders

Solenysa is a genus of Asian sheet weavers that was first described by Eugène Louis Simon in 1894.

== Species ==
As of May 2019 it contains fifteen species, found in Japan, China, Taiwan, and Korea:

- Solenysa geumoensis Seo, 1996 – Korea
- Solenysa lanyuensis Tu, 2011 – Taiwan
- Solenysa longqiensis Li & Song, 1992 – China, Taiwan
- Solenysa macrodonta Wang, Ono & Tu, 2015 – Japan
- Solenysa mellotteei Simon, 1894 (type) – Japan
- Solenysa ogatai Ono, 2011 – Japan
- Solenysa partibilis Tu, Ono & Li, 2007 – Japan
- Solenysa protrudens Gao, Zhu & Sha, 1993 – China
- Solenysa reflexilis Tu, Ono & Li, 2007 – Japan
- Solenysa retractilis Tu, 2011 – China
- Solenysa spiralis Tian & Tu, 2018 – China
- Solenysa tianmushana Tu, 2011 – China
- Solenysa trunciformis Wang, Ono & Tu, 2015 – Japan
- Solenysa wulingensis Li & Song, 1992 – China
- Solenysa yangmingshana Tu, 2011 – Taiwan
