= Aprifrontalia =

Scientific classification
- Kingdom: Animalia
- Phylum: Arthropoda
- Subphylum: Chelicerata
- Class: Arachnida
- Order: Araneae
- Infraorder: Araneomorphae
- Family: Linyphiidae
- Genus: Aprifrontalia; Oi, 1960

Type species
- A. mascula (Karsch, 1879)

Species
- A. afflata Ma & Zhu, 1991 – China; A. mascula (Karsch, 1879) – Russia, Korea, Taiwan, Japan

Genus of spiders

Aprifrontalia is a genus of Asian dwarf spiders that was first described by R. Oi in 1960. As of May 2019 it contains only two species: A. afflata and A. mascula.
