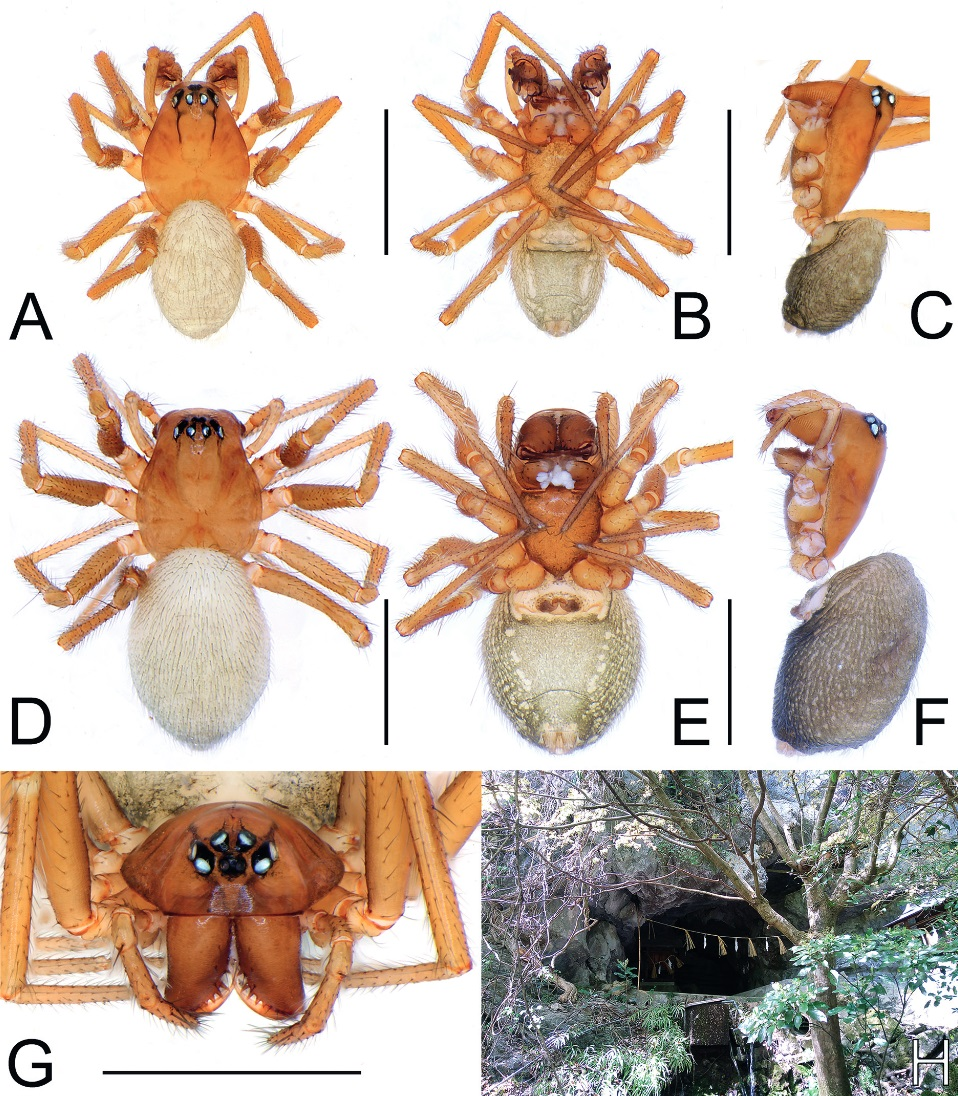

Scientific classification
- Kingdom: Animalia
- Phylum: Arthropoda
- Subphylum: Chelicerata
- Class: Arachnida
- Order: Araneae
- Infraorder: Araneomorphae
- Family: Linyphiidae
- Genus: Nihonella; Ballarin & Yamasaki, 2021
- Species: N. chika

Binomial name
- Nihonella chika Ballarin & Yamasaki, 2021

= Nihonella =

Genus of spiders

Nihonella is a monotypic genus of east Asian sheet weavers containing the single species, Nihonella chika. It was first described by F. Ballarin and T. Yamasaki in 2021, and it has only been found in Japan.
