= Esophyllas =

Scientific classification
- Kingdom: Animalia
- Phylum: Arthropoda
- Subphylum: Chelicerata
- Class: Arachnida
- Order: Araneae
- Infraorder: Araneomorphae
- Family: Linyphiidae
- Genus: Esophyllas; Prentice & Redak, 2012

Type species
- E. vetteri Prentice & Redak, 2012

Species
- E. synankylis Prentice & Redak, 2012 – USA; E. vetteri Prentice & Redak, 2012 – USA

Genus of spiders

Esophyllas is a genus of North American dwarf spiders that was first described by T. R. Prentice & R. A. Redak in 2012. As of May 2019 it contains only two species, both found in the United States: E. synankylis and E. vetteri.
