= Acroterius =

Scientific classification
- Kingdom: Animalia
- Phylum: Arthropoda
- Subphylum: Chelicerata
- Class: Arachnida
- Order: Araneae
- Infraorder: Araneomorphae
- Family: Linyphiidae
- Genus: Acroterius; Irfan, Bashir & Peng, 2021

Type species
- A. brevis Irfan, Bashir & Peng, 2021

Species
- 12, see text

Genus of spiders

Acroterius is a genus of east Asian sheet weavers. It was first described by M. Irfan, S. Bashir and X. J. Peng in 2021, and it has only been found in China.

== Species ==
As of December 2021 it contains twelve species:

- A. absentus Irfan, Bashir & Peng, 2021 – China
- A. brevis Irfan, Bashir & Peng, 2021 (type) – China
- A. camur Irfan, Bashir & Peng, 2021 – China
- A. circinatus Irfan, Bashir & Peng, 2021 – China
- A. hamatus Irfan, Bashir & Peng, 2021 – China
- A. inversus Irfan, Bashir & Peng, 2021 – China
- A. latus Irfan, Bashir & Peng, 2021 – China
- A. longidentatus Irfan, Bashir & Peng, 2021 – China
- A. longimultus Irfan, Bashir & Peng, 2021 – China
- A. longiprojectus Irfan, Bashir & Peng, 2021 – China
- A. ovatus Irfan, Bashir & Peng, 2021 – China
- A. parvus Irfan, Bashir & Peng, 2021 – China
