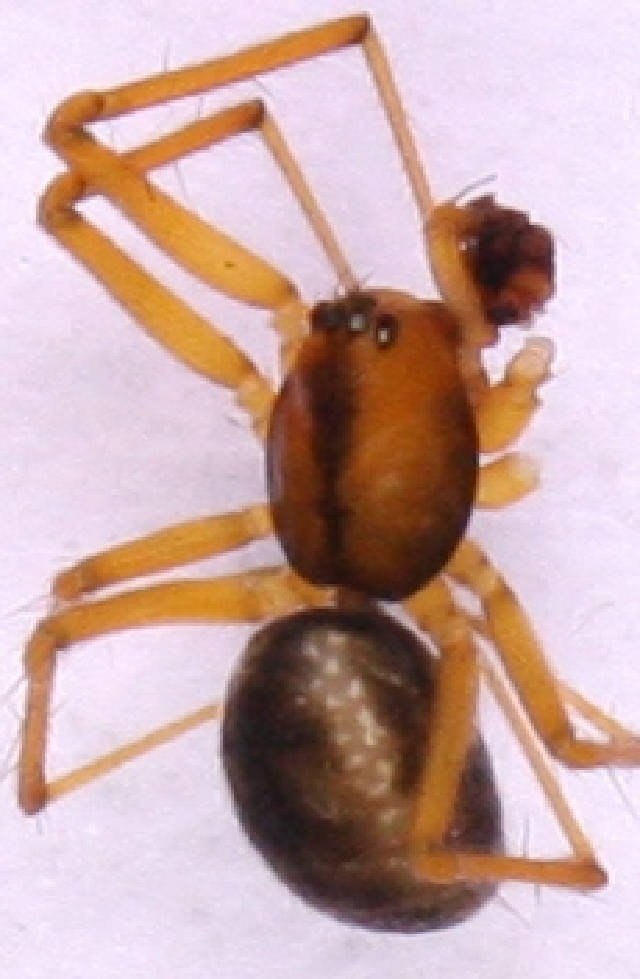
- B. index

Scientific classification
- Kingdom: Animalia
- Phylum: Arthropoda
- Subphylum: Chelicerata
- Class: Arachnida
- Order: Araneae
- Infraorder: Araneomorphae
- Family: Linyphiidae
- Genus: Bolephthyphantes; Strand, 1901

Type species
- B. index (Thorell, 1856)

Species
- B. caucasicus (Tanasevitch, 1990) – Caucasus (Russia, Azerbaijan); B. index (Thorell, 1856) – Greenland, Europe, Russia (Europe to Far East), Kazakhstan; B. indexoides (Tanasevitch, 1989) – Central Asia

= Bolephthyphantes =

Genus of spiders

Bolephthyphantes is a genus of dwarf spiders that was first described by Embrik Strand in 1901. As of May 2019 it contains only three species: B. caucasicus, B. index, and B. indexoides.
