= Lutosus =

Scientific classification
- Kingdom: Animalia
- Phylum: Arthropoda
- Subphylum: Chelicerata
- Class: Arachnida
- Order: Araneae
- Infraorder: Araneomorphae
- Family: Linyphiidae
- Genus: Lutosus; Irfan, Zhang & Peng, 2022
- Species: L. projectus

Binomial name
- Lutosus projectus Irfan, Zhang & Peng, 2022

Synonyms
- Lutosus projectis Irfan, Zhang & Peng, 2022

Species of spider

Lutosus is a monotypic genus of spiders in the family Linyphiidae containing the single species, Lutosus projectus.

== Distribution ==
Lutosus projectus is endemic to Yunnan Province of China.

== Life style ==
The males were sampled from forest understory on slopes between 2,200 m and 2,900 m altitude. The female has not been described.

== Etymology ==
The genus name is from Latin lutosus "muddy" (according to the authors "thick"), referring to the thick spine on the patella of the male palp.

The specific name (misspelled "projectis" in the original publication) is Latin for "projected", and refers to the distal arm of the paracymbium with four projections in the male palp.
