= Parameioneta =

Scientific classification
- Kingdom: Animalia
- Phylum: Arthropoda
- Subphylum: Chelicerata
- Class: Arachnida
- Order: Araneae
- Infraorder: Araneomorphae
- Family: Linyphiidae
- Genus: Parameioneta; Locket, 1982

Type species
- P. spicata Locket, 1982

Species
- 8, see text

Genus of spiders

Parameioneta is a genus of Asian dwarf spiders that was first described by G. H. Locket in 1982.

== Species ==
As of May 2021 it contains eight species:

- Parameioneta bilobata Li & Zhu, 1993 – China, Vietnam
- Parameioneta bishou Zhao & Li, 2014 – China, Thailand
- Parameioneta javaensis Tanasevitch, 2020 – Indonesia (Java)
- Parameioneta multifida Zhao & Li, 2014 – China
- Parameioneta spicata Locket, 1982 (type) – Thailand, Malaysia
- Parameioneta sulawesi (Tanasevitch, 2012) – Indonesia (Sulawesi)
- Parameioneta tricolorata Zhao & Li, 2014 – China
- Parameioneta yongjing Yin, 2012 – China
