= Pseudomicrocentria =

Scientific classification
- Kingdom: Animalia
- Phylum: Arthropoda
- Subphylum: Chelicerata
- Class: Arachnida
- Order: Araneae
- Infraorder: Araneomorphae
- Family: Linyphiidae
- Genus: Pseudomicrocentria; Miller, 1970

Type species
- P. minutissima Miller, 1970

Species
- 3, see text

Genus of spiders

Pseudomicrocentria is a genus of sheet weavers that was first described by F. Miller in 1970.

== Species ==
As of October 2025, this genus includes three species:

- Pseudomicrocentria minutissima Miller, 1970 – West, Central, South Africa (type species)
- Pseudomicrocentria simplex Locket, 1982 – Singapore
- Pseudomicrocentria uncata Tanasevitch, 2020 – Malaysia (Borneo)
