= Xim =

Scientific classification
- Kingdom: Animalia
- Phylum: Arthropoda
- Subphylum: Chelicerata
- Class: Arachnida
- Order: Araneae
- Infraorder: Araneomorphae
- Family: Linyphiidae
- Genus: Xim; Ibarra-Núñez, Chamé-Vázquez & Maya-Morales, 2021
- Species: X. trenzado

Binomial name
- Xim trenzado Ibarra-Núñez, Chamé-Vázquez & Maya-Morales, 2021

Genus of spiders

Xim is a monotypic genus of North American sheet weavers containing the single species, Xim trenzado. It was first described by G. Ibarra-Núñez, D. Chamé-Vázquez and J. Maya-Morales in 2021, and it has only been found in Mexico.
