= Paratapinocyba =

Scientific classification
- Kingdom: Animalia
- Phylum: Arthropoda
- Subphylum: Chelicerata
- Class: Arachnida
- Order: Araneae
- Infraorder: Araneomorphae
- Family: Linyphiidae
- Genus: Paratapinocyba; Saito, 1986

Type species
- P. kumadai Saito, 1986

Species
- 2, see text

Genus of spiders

Paratapinocyba is a genus of Asian dwarf spiders that was first described by H. Saito in 1986.

== Species ==
As of May 2019 it contains two species:

- Paratapinocyba kumadai Saito, 1986 (type) – Japan
- Paratapinocyba oiwa (Saito, 1980) – Japan
