= Ryojius =

Scientific classification
- Kingdom: Animalia
- Phylum: Arthropoda
- Subphylum: Chelicerata
- Class: Arachnida
- Order: Araneae
- Infraorder: Araneomorphae
- Family: Linyphiidae
- Genus: Ryojius; Saito & Ono, 2001

Type species
- R. japonicus Saito & Ono, 2001

Species
- R. japonicus Saito & Ono, 2001 – Korea, Japan; R. nanyuensis (Chen & Yin, 2000) – China; R. occidentalis Saito & Ono, 2001 – Japan

Genus of spiders

Ryojius is a genus of Asian sheet weaver spiders that was first described by H. Saito & H. Ono in 2001. As of May 2019 it contains only three species, found in China, Japan, and Korea: R. japonicus, R. nanyuensis, and R. occidentalis.
