= Machadocara =

Scientific classification
- Kingdom: Animalia
- Phylum: Arthropoda
- Subphylum: Chelicerata
- Class: Arachnida
- Order: Araneae
- Infraorder: Araneomorphae
- Family: Linyphiidae
- Genus: Machadocara; Miller, 1970

Type species
- M. gongylioides Miller, 1970

Species
- M. dubia Miller, 1970 – Congo; M. gongylioides Miller, 1970 – Zambia

Genus of spiders

Machadocara is a genus of African dwarf spiders that was first described by F. Miller in 1970. As of May 2019 it contains only two species, both found in Middle Africa and Zambia: M. dubia and M. gongylioides.
