= Thaumatoncus =

Scientific classification
- Kingdom: Animalia
- Phylum: Arthropoda
- Subphylum: Chelicerata
- Class: Arachnida
- Order: Araneae
- Infraorder: Araneomorphae
- Family: Linyphiidae
- Genus: Thaumatoncus; Simon, 1884

Type species
- T. indicator Simon, 1884

Species
- 2, see text

Genus of spiders

Thaumatoncus is a genus of sheet weavers that was first described by Eugène Louis Simon in 1884.

== Species ==
As of May 2019 it contains two species.

- Thaumatoncus indicator Simon, 1884 – Spain, France, Algeria, Tunisia
- Thaumatoncus secundus Bosmans, 2002 – Algeria, Israel
