= Ternatus =

Scientific classification
- Kingdom: Animalia
- Phylum: Arthropoda
- Subphylum: Chelicerata
- Class: Arachnida
- Order: Araneae
- Infraorder: Araneomorphae
- Family: Linyphiidae
- Genus: Ternatus; Sun, Li & Tu, 2012

Type species
- T. malleatus Sun, Li & Tu, 2012

Species
- T. malleatus Sun, Li & Tu, 2012 – China; T. siculus Sun, Li & Tu, 2012 – China

Genus of spiders

Ternatus is a genus of East Asian sheet weavers that was first described by N. Sun, B. Li & L. H. Tu in 2012. As of May 2019 it contains only two species, both found in China: T. malleatus and T. siculus.
