= Zygottus =

Scientific classification
- Kingdom: Animalia
- Phylum: Arthropoda
- Subphylum: Chelicerata
- Class: Arachnida
- Order: Araneae
- Infraorder: Araneomorphae
- Family: Linyphiidae
- Genus: Zygottus; Chamberlin, 1949

Type species
- Z. corvallis Chamberlin, 1949

Species
- 2, see text

Genus of spiders

Zygottus is a genus of American sheet weavers that was first described by Ralph Vary Chamberlin in 1949.

== Species ==
As of June 2019 it contains only two species:

- Zygottus corvallis Chamberlin, 1949 – USA
- Zygottus oregonus Chamberlin, 1949 – USA
