= Sthelota =

Scientific classification
- Kingdom: Animalia
- Phylum: Arthropoda
- Subphylum: Chelicerata
- Class: Arachnida
- Order: Araneae
- Infraorder: Araneomorphae
- Family: Linyphiidae
- Genus: Sthelota; Simon, 1894

Type species
- S. albonotata (Keyserling, 1886)

Species
- S. albonotata (Keyserling, 1886) – Panama; S. sana (O. Pickard-Cambridge, 1898) – Guatemala

Genus of spiders

Sthelota is a genus of Central American sheet weavers that was first described by Eugène Louis Simon in 1894. As of May 2019 it contains only two species, both found in Guatemala and Panama: S. albonotata and S. sana.
