= Laogone =

Scientific classification
- Kingdom: Animalia
- Phylum: Arthropoda
- Subphylum: Chelicerata
- Class: Arachnida
- Order: Araneae
- Infraorder: Araneomorphae
- Family: Linyphiidae
- Genus: Laogone; Tanasevitch

Type species
- Laogone cephala

Species
- Laogone bai Zhao & Li, 2014 - China; Laogone cephala Tanasevitch, 2014 - Laos; Laogone lunata Zhao & Li, 2014 - China

Genus of spiders

Laogone is a genus of spiders in the family Linyphiidae. It was first described in 2014 by Tanasevitch. As of 2017, it contains 3 species.
