= Taranucnus =

Scientific classification
- Kingdom: Animalia
- Phylum: Arthropoda
- Subphylum: Chelicerata
- Class: Arachnida
- Order: Araneae
- Infraorder: Araneomorphae
- Family: Linyphiidae
- Genus: Taranucnus; Simon, 1884

Type species
- T. setosus (O. Pickard-Cambridge, 1863)

Species
- 6, see text

Genus of spiders

Taranucnus is a genus of sheet weavers that was first described by Eugène Louis Simon in 1884.

== Species ==
As of May 2019 it contains six species, found in Europe and the United States:

- Taranucnus beskidicus Hirna, 2018 – Ukraine
- Taranucnus bihari Fage, 1931 – Poland, Slovakia, Romania, Ukraine
- Taranucnus carpaticus Gnelitsa, 2016 – Ukraine
- Taranucnus nishikii Yaginuma, 1972 – Japan
- Taranucnus ornithes (Barrows, 1940) – USA
- Taranucnus setosus (O. Pickard-Cambridge, 1863) (type) – Europe, Turkey, Russia (Europe to Central Siberia)
