= Pahangone =

Scientific classification
- Kingdom: Animalia
- Phylum: Arthropoda
- Subphylum: Chelicerata
- Class: Arachnida
- Order: Araneae
- Infraorder: Araneomorphae
- Family: Linyphiidae
- Genus: Pahangone; Tanasevitch, 2018
- Species: P. mirabilis

Binomial name
- Pahangone mirabilis Tanasevitch, 2018

Genus of spiders

Pahangone is a genus of dwarf spiders containing the single species, Pahangone mirabilis. It was first described by A. V. Tanasevitch in 2018, and is only found in Malaysia.
