= Nipponotusukuru =

Scientific classification
- Kingdom: Animalia
- Phylum: Arthropoda
- Subphylum: Chelicerata
- Class: Arachnida
- Order: Araneae
- Infraorder: Araneomorphae
- Family: Linyphiidae
- Genus: Nipponotusukuru; Saito & Ono, 2001

Type species
- N. enzanensis Saito & Ono, 2001

Species
- 2, see text

Genus of spiders

Nipponotusukuru is a genus of Asian dwarf spiders that was first described by H. Saito & H. Ono in 2001.

== Species ==
As of May 2019 it contains two species:

- Nipponotusukuru enzanensis Saito & Ono, 2001 (type) – Japan
- Nipponotusukuru spiniger Saito & Ono, 2001 – Japan
