= Enguterothrix =

Scientific classification
- Kingdom: Animalia
- Phylum: Arthropoda
- Subphylum: Chelicerata
- Class: Arachnida
- Order: Araneae
- Infraorder: Araneomorphae
- Family: Linyphiidae
- Genus: Enguterothrix; Denis, 1962

Type species
- E. crinipes Denis, 1962

Species
- E. crinipes Denis, 1962 – Congo; E. simpulum (Tanasevitch, 2014) – Thailand, Malaysia (Borneo), Indonesia (Bali)

Synonyms
- Apophygone Tanasevitch, 2014

Genus of spiders

Enguterothrix is a genus of dwarf spiders that was first described by J. Denis in 1962. As of May 2019 it contains only two species: E. crinipes and E. simpulum.
