= Absconditus =

Scientific classification
- Kingdom: Animalia
- Phylum: Arthropoda
- Subphylum: Chelicerata
- Class: Arachnida
- Order: Araneae
- Infraorder: Araneomorphae
- Family: Linyphiidae
- Genus: Absconditus; Irfan, Zhang & Peng, 2022
- Species: A. acer

Binomial name
- Absconditus acer Irfan, Zhang & Peng, 2022

Synonyms
- Absconditus acerus Irfan, Zhang & Peng, 2022

Species of spider

Absconditus is a monotypic genus of spiders in the family Linyphiidae containing the single species, Absconditus acer.

== Distribution ==
Absconditus acer is only known from Yunnan Province in China.

== Etymology ==
The genus name is from Latin absconditus "hidden", because the radix in the distal suprategular apophysis in the male palp is almost completely hidden.

The specific name is from Latin acer "sharp", referring to a long and sharp projection in the distal suprategular apophysis distally of the male palp. The authors used "acerus" in the original publication, but corrected it to "acer" afterwards.
