= Bursellia =

Scientific classification
- Kingdom: Animalia
- Phylum: Arthropoda
- Subphylum: Chelicerata
- Class: Arachnida
- Order: Araneae
- Infraorder: Araneomorphae
- Family: Linyphiidae
- Genus: Bursellia; Holm, 1962

Type species
- B. glabra Holm, 1962

Species
- 8, see text

Genus of spiders

Bursellia is a genus of African dwarf spiders that was first described by Å. Holm in 1962.

== Species ==
As of May 2019 it contains eight species and one subspecies:

- Bursellia cameroonensis Bosmans & Jocqué, 1983 – Cameroon
- Bursellia comata Holm, 1962 – Congo, Uganda
  - Bursellia c. kivuensis Holm, 1964 – Congo
- Bursellia gibbicervix (Denis, 1962) – Tanzania
- Bursellia glabra Holm, 1962 (type) – Congo, Kenya
- Bursellia holmi Bosmans, 1977 – Kenya
- Bursellia paghi Jocqué & Scharff, 1986 – Tanzania
- Bursellia setifera (Denis, 1962) – Cameroon, Congo, Kenya, Tanzania, Malawi
- Bursellia unicornis Bosmans, 1988 – Cameroon
