= Vittatus =

Scientific classification
- Domain: Eukaryota
- Kingdom: Animalia
- Phylum: Arthropoda
- Subphylum: Chelicerata
- Class: Arachnida
- Order: Araneae
- Infraorder: Araneomorphae
- Family: Linyphiidae
- Genus: Vittatus; Zhao & Li, 2014

Type species
- V. fencha Zhao & Li, 2014

Species
- 4, see text

Genus of spiders

Vittatus is a genus of spiders in the family Linyphiidae. It was first described in 2014 by Zhao & Li.

== Species ==
As of 2017, it contains 4 species:

- Vittatus bian Zhao & Li, 2014 − China
- Vittatus fencha Zhao & Li, 2014 (type) − China
- Vittatus latus Zhao & Li, 2014 − China
- Vittatus pan Zhao & Li, 2014 − China
