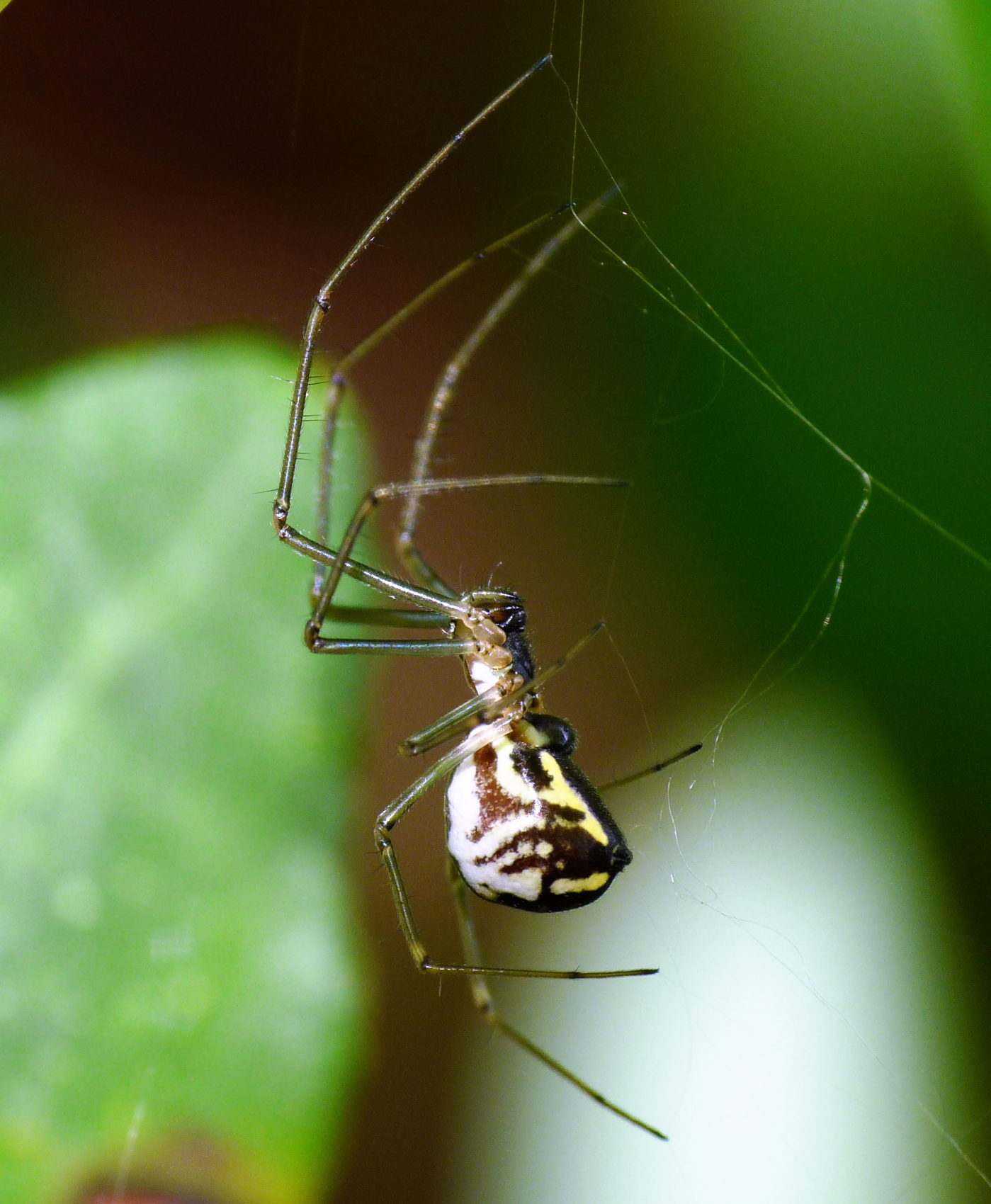
- Neriene radiata
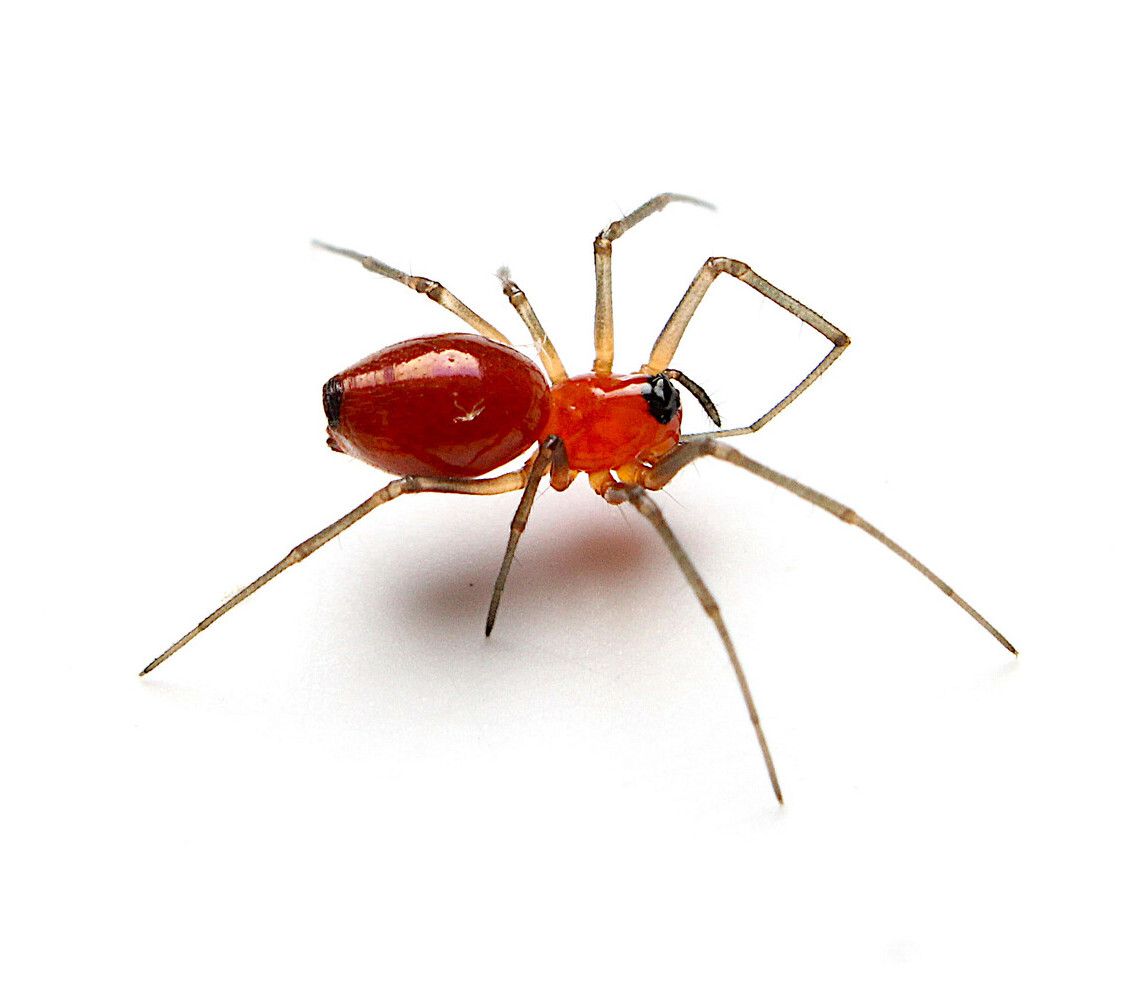
- Florinda coccinea

Scientific classification
- Kingdom: Animalia
- Phylum: Arthropoda
- Subphylum: Chelicerata
- Class: Arachnida
- Order: Araneae
- Infraorder: Araneomorphae
- Superfamily: Araneoidea
- Family: Linyphiidae; Blackwall, 1859

Subfamilies
- Dubiaraneinae; Erigoninae; Leptyphantinae; Linyphiinae; Micronetinae; Mynogleninae; Stemonyphantinae

Diversity
- 641 genera, 4,962 species
- blue: reported countries (WSC) green: observation hotspots (iNaturalist)

= Linyphiidae =

Dwarf spiders Temporal range: Cretaceous–present

Family of spiders

Linyphiidae, spiders commonly known as sheet weavers (from the shape of their webs), or money spiders (in the United Kingdom, Ireland, Australia, New Zealand, and Portugal) is a family of very small spiders comprising around 5,000 described species in around 650 genera worldwide. This makes Linyphiidae the second largest family of spiders after the Salticidae.

The family is poorly understood due to their small body size and wide distribution; new genera and species are still being discovered throughout the world. The newest such genus is Himalafurca from Nepal, formally described in April 2021 by Tanasevitch. Since it is so difficult to identify such tiny spiders, there are regular changes in taxonomy as species are combined or divided.

Money spiders are known for drifting through the air via a technique termed "ballooning". Females of winter-active sheet weavers, such as Tenuiphantes cristatus and Bolephthyphantes index, are known for building sheet webs in depressions on the surface of snow.

Within the agriculture industry, money spiders are regarded as biological control agents against pest species like aphids and springtails.

== Description ==
In Linyphiidae, the clypeus is normally over twice as high as the diameter of the anterior median eyes. The chelicerae have lateral stridulating ridges and lack lateral condyles.

The legs are long and thin, and bear macrosetae. The abdomen is usually oval or elongated.

== Distribution ==
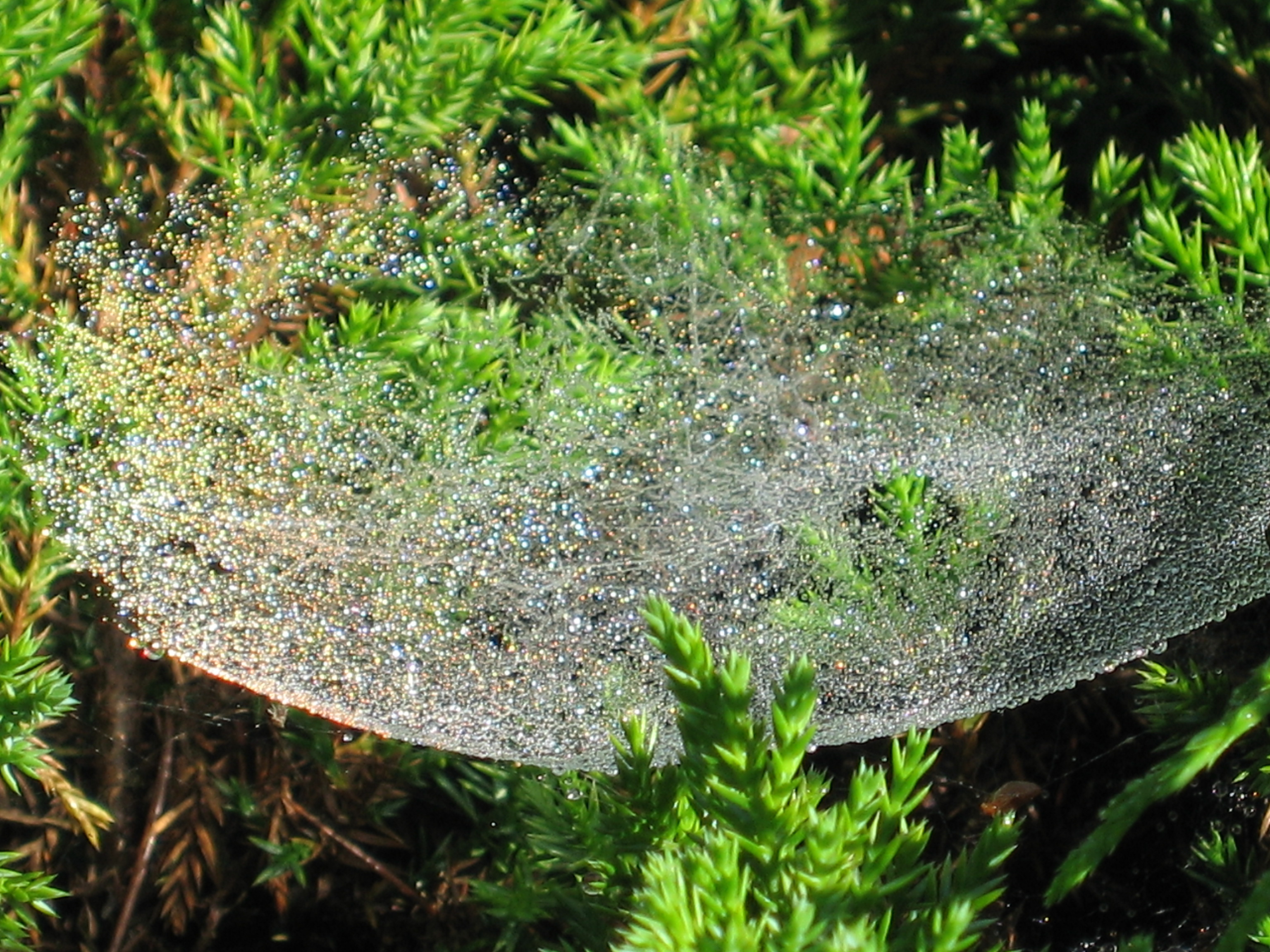
Sheet weaver's web

Spiders of this family occur nearly worldwide. In Norway many species have been found walking on snow at temperatures of down to −7 °C.

While these spiders are light enough to utilize ballooning for travel, they are limited by the physics of an often turbulent atmosphere and microclimate. For this reason ballooning spiders have little control over where they land, leading to a high mortality rate for the practice and its predominant usage by spiderlings and juveniles. The travel of money spiders by ballooning likely contributes to their vast distribution and speciation.

== Predators and prey ==
- Among birds, goldcrests are known to prey on money spiders.
- Money spiders are known to prey on aphids, springtails, flies, and other spiders.

== Taxonomy ==
The Pimoidae are the sister group to the Linyphiidae.

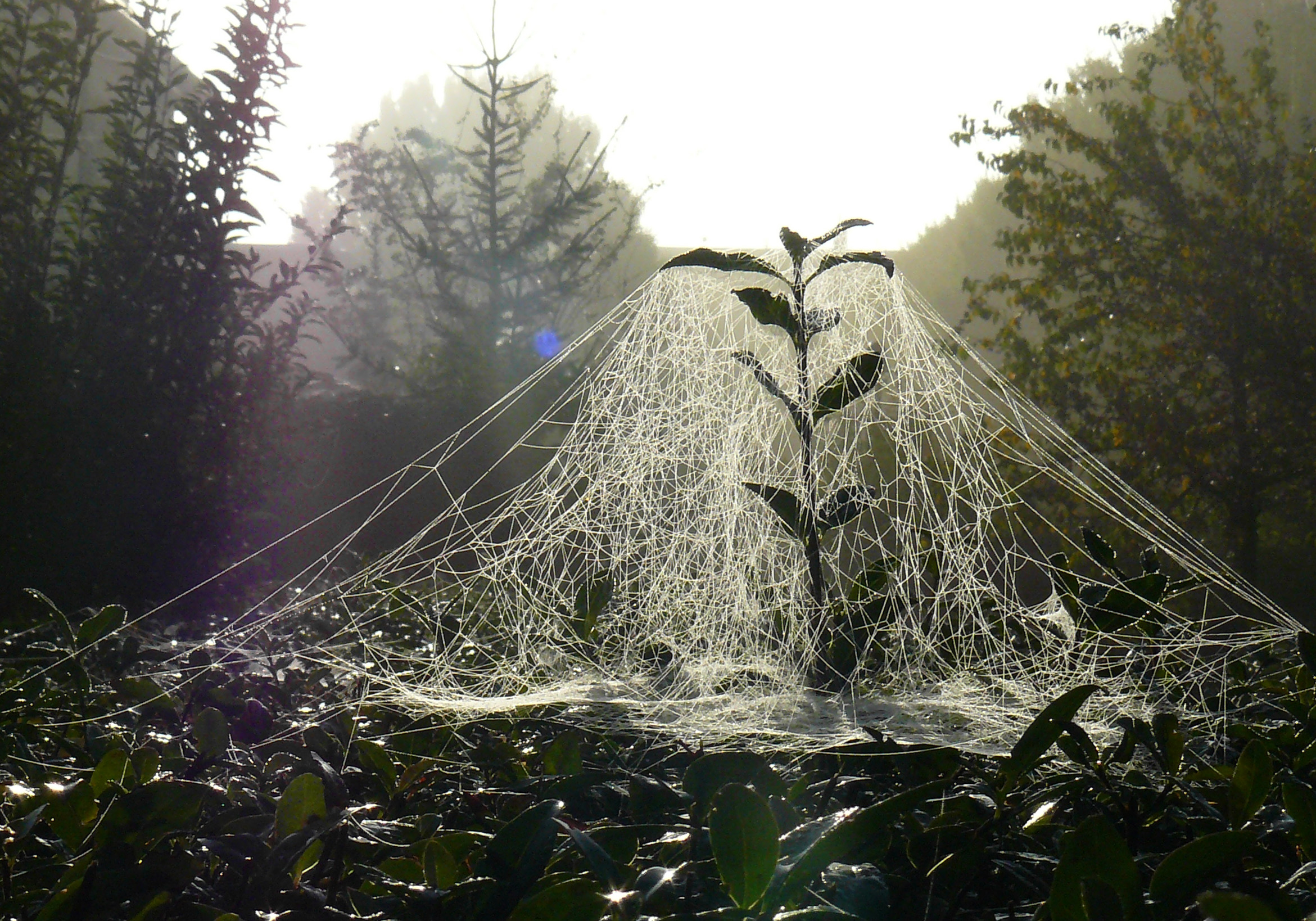
Sheet weaver's web in morning dew

There are six subfamilies, of which Linyphiinae (the sheetweb spiders), Erigoninae (the dwarf spiders), and Micronetinae, contain the majority of described species.

Many species have been described in monotypic genera, especially in the Erigoninae, which probably reflects the scientific techniques traditionally used in this family. Common genera include Neriene, Lepthyphantes, Erigone, Eperigone, Bathyphantes, Troglohyphantes, Tennesseellum and many others. These are among the most abundant spiders in the temperate regions, although many are also found in the tropics. The generally larger bodied members of the subfamily Linyphiinae are commonly found in classic "bowl and doily" webs or filmy domes. The usually tiny members of the Erigoninae are builders of tiny sheet webs. These tiny spiders (usually 3 mm or less) commonly balloon even as adults and may be very numerous in a given area on one day, only to disappear the next.

Males in the subfamily Erigoninae typically have modified cephalothoraxes. These modifications are diagnostic for a given taxon, being genus or species-specific. These come in an impressive array of forms including, but not limited to, grooves, tubercles, projections, bumps, lobes, and spines. Occasionally, the projections may be decorated with tufts of hair or even bear eyes.

The following are select examples of species in which males possess rather remarkable modifications. Walckenaeria acuminata has its eyes placed on a tall, thin spire whose height exceeds the length of the cephalothorax. Grammonota gigas has a transverse row of four longitudinal lobes behind the eyes. Gnathonargus unicorn has a long, slender, upward-pointing clypeal projection resembling a unicorn horn. Hypselistes florens has a cephalic lobe shaped like an hourglass when viewed from the front. Perregrinus deformis has a short, downcurved clypeal projection resembling a human nose. Praestigia kulczynskii has its anterior median eyes placed ventrally at the end of a long, thick projection issuing from the clypeus. The genera Coreorgonal and Spirembolus have their cephalic regions deeply divided into two pronounced lobes. Eskovia exarmata has a cephalothorax shaped like a trapezoid when viewed laterally. Horcotes quadricristatus has a single, sharp tooth sticking up between the anterior and posterior eyes.

Similarly, the pedipalps of males range from simple to complex in their design, with some possessing striking features and arrangements of palpal sclerites that are unique for a given genus and/or species.

A few spiders in this family include:

- Bowl and doily spider, Frontinella pyramitela
- Filmy dome spider, Neriene radiata
- Blacktailed red sheetweaver, Florinda coccinea
- Orsonwelles, a genus of giant Hawaiian Linyphids containing the largest Linyphiid, O. malus.
- Erigone atra, a dwarf spider

== Genera ==
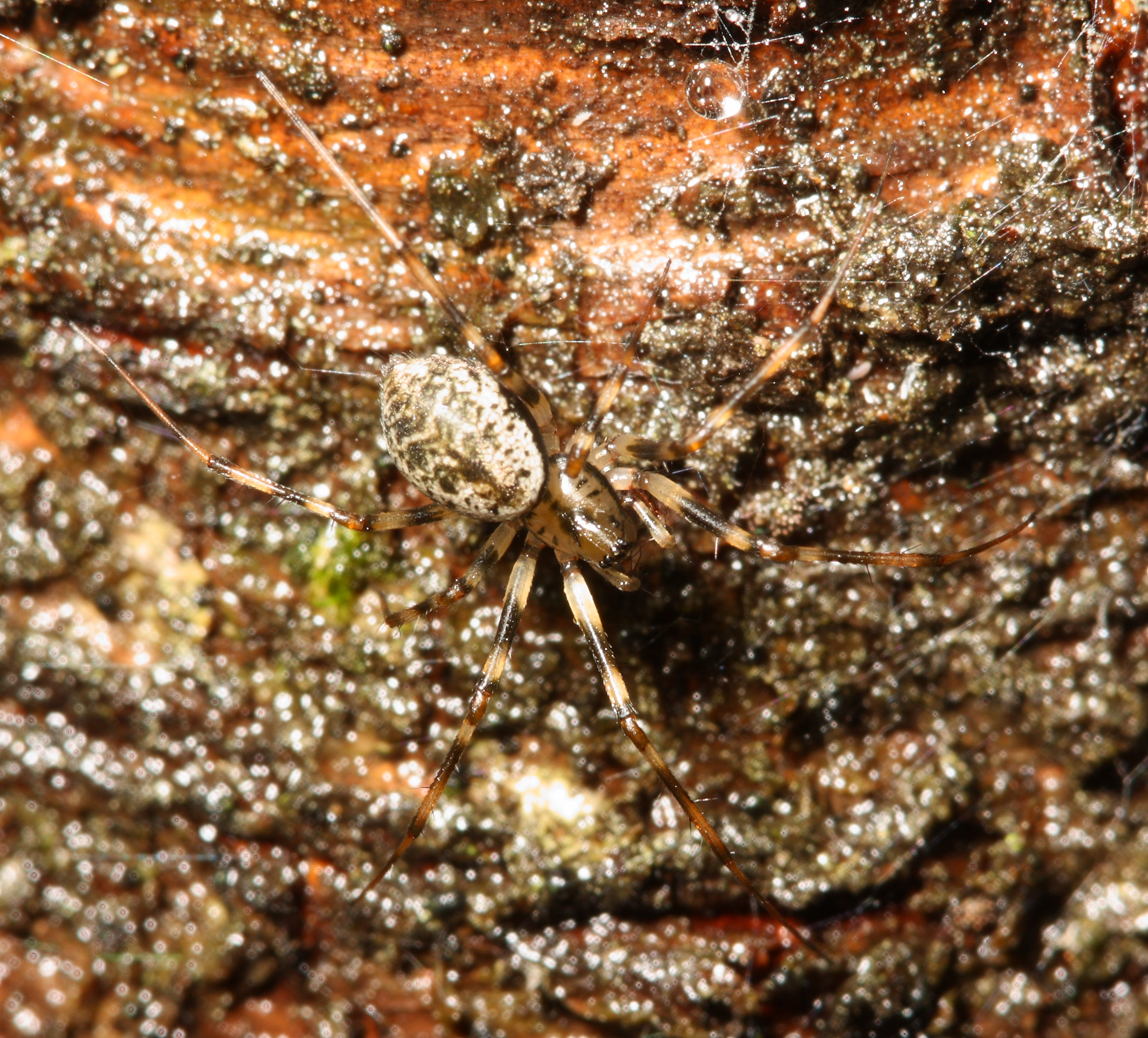
Drapetisca alteranda

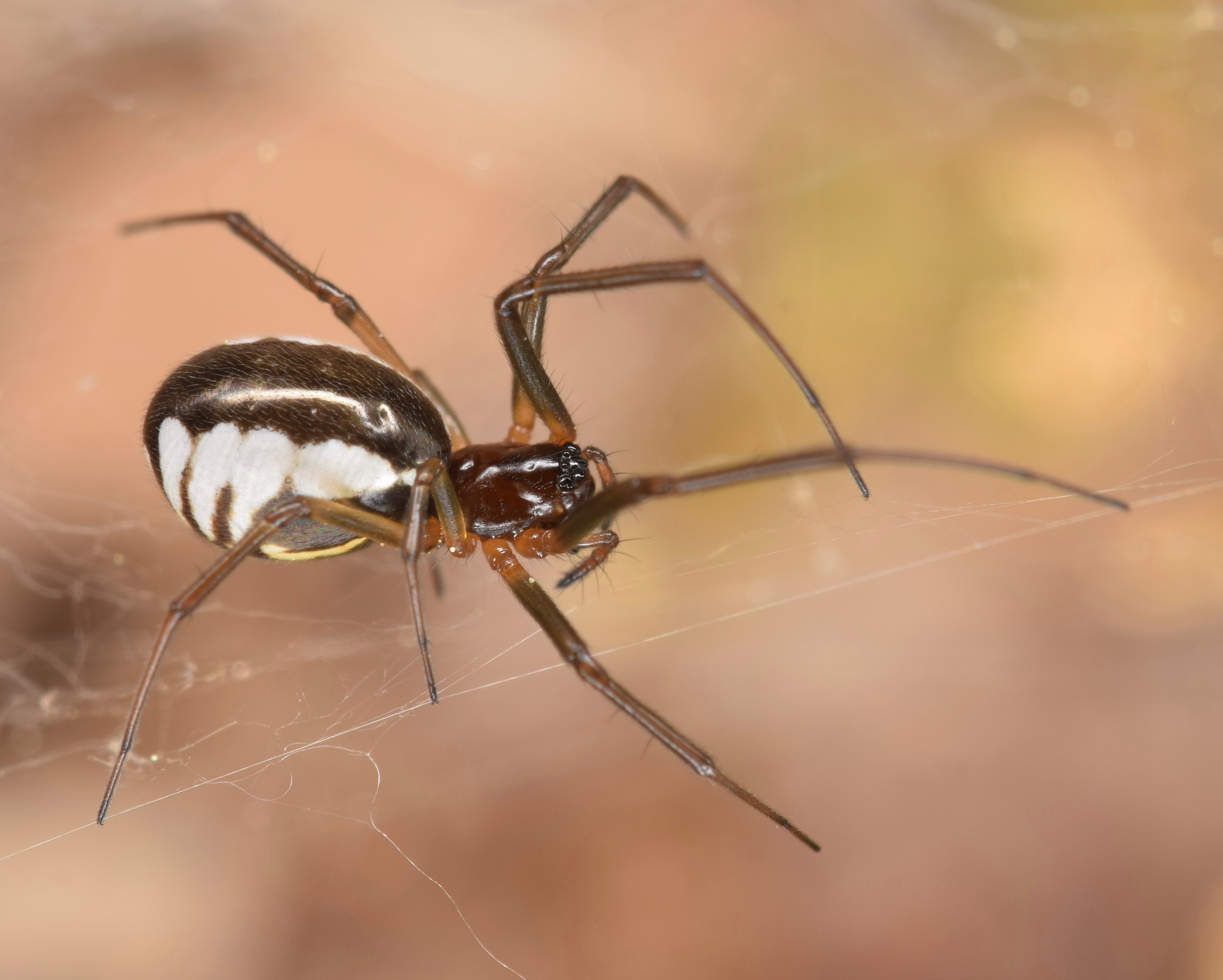
Frontinella pyramitela

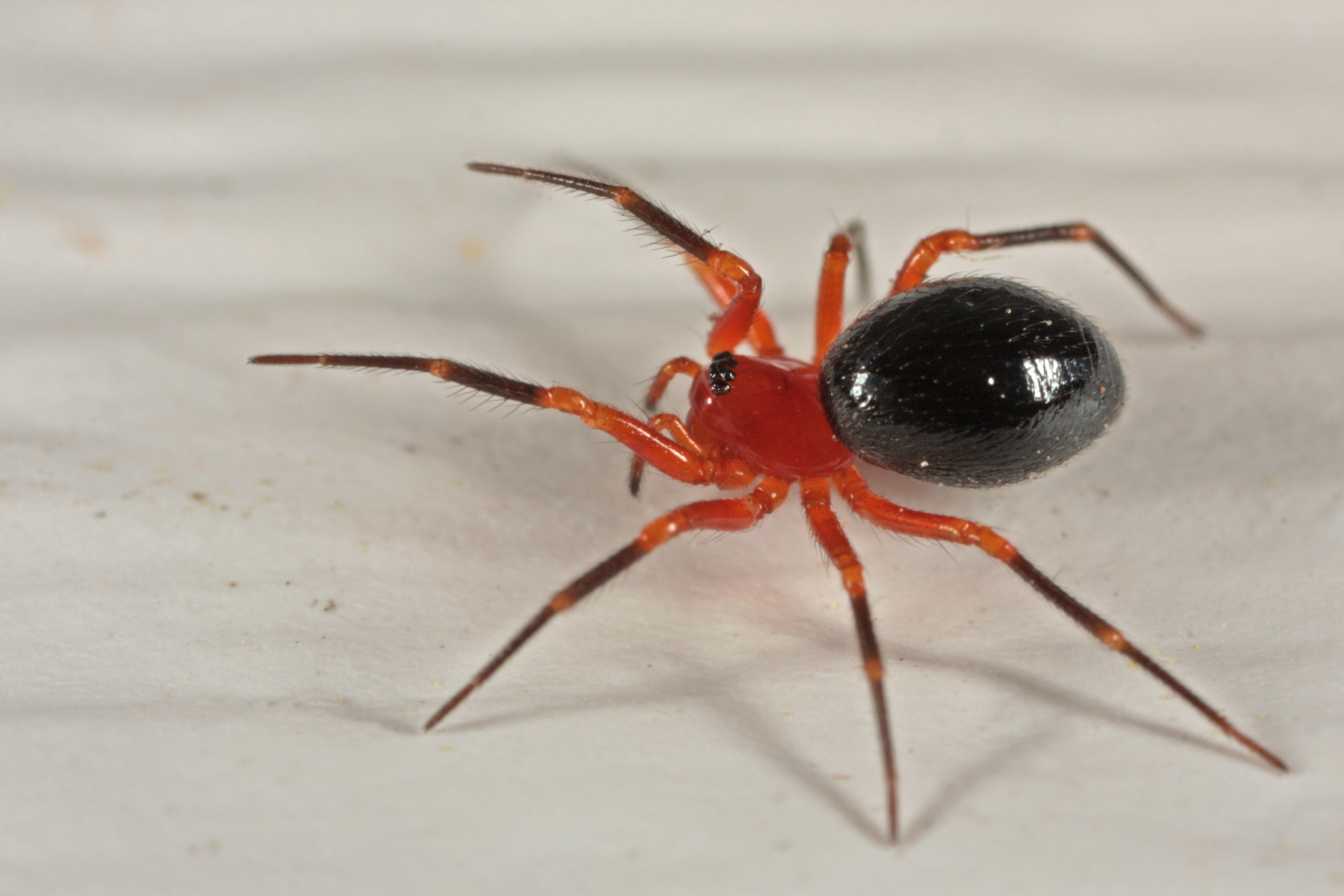
Hypselistes florens

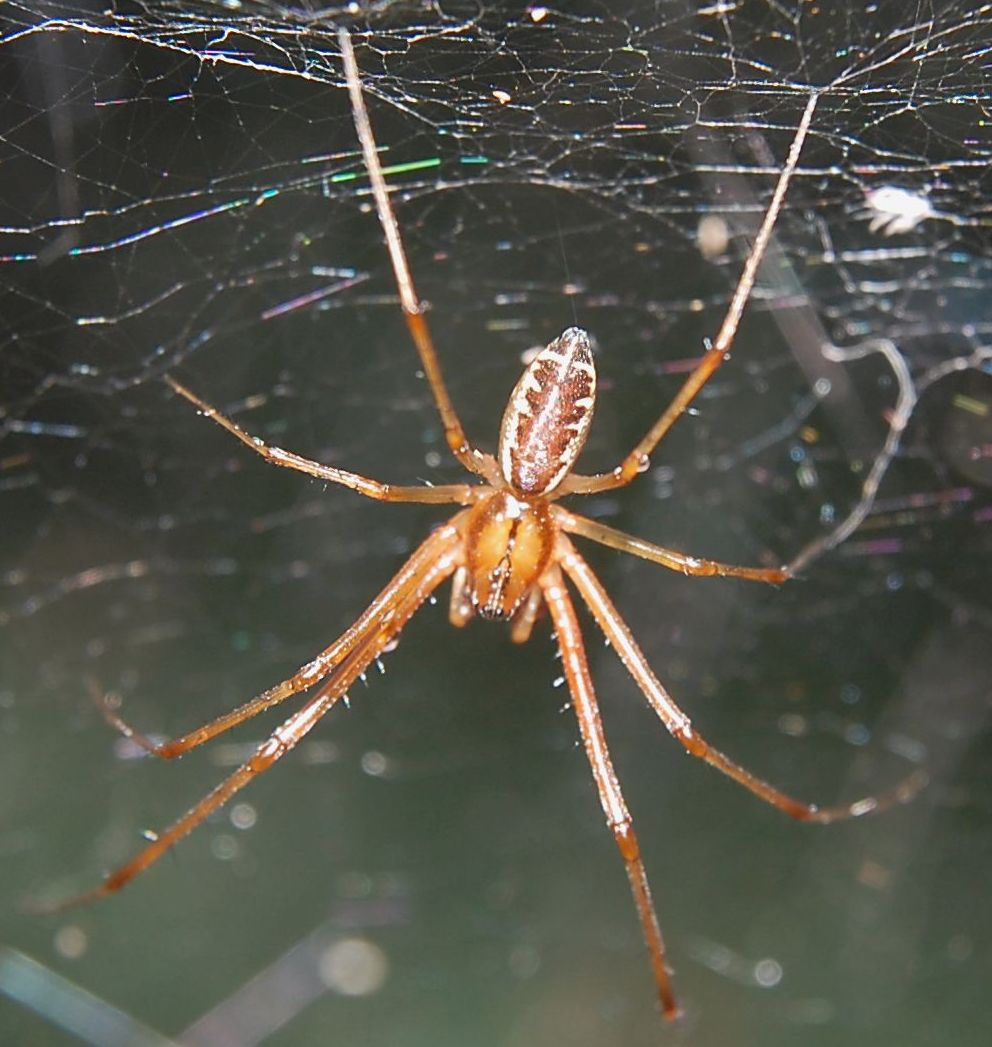
male Linyphia triangularis

As of October 2025, this family includes 641 genera and 4962 species.

Complete genus list
- Abacoproeces Simon, 1884 – Alps, Russia
- Aberdaria Holm, 1962 – Kenya
- Abiskoa Saaristo & Tanasevitch, 2000 – China, Poland, Russia, Scandinavia
- Absconditus Irfan, Zhang & Peng, 2022 – China
- Acanoides Sun, Marusik & Tu, 2014 – China
- Acanthoneta Eskov & Marusik, 1992 – China, Russia, North America
- Acartauchenius Simon, 1884 – Algeria, Morocco, Tunisia, Asia, Russia, Italy, Malta
- Acorigone Wunderlich, 2008 – Azores
- Acroterius Irfan, Bashir & Peng, 2021 – China
- Adelonetria Millidge, 1991 – Chile
- Afribactrus Wunderlich, 1995 – South Africa
- Afromynoglenes Merrett & Russell-Smith, 1996 – Ethiopia
- Afroneta Holm, 1968 – Cameroon, DR Congo, Eastern Africa
- Afrophantes Tanasevitch, 2025 – Cameroon, Ethiopia, Kenya, Tanzania
- Afrotrichona Tanasevitch, 2020 – Kenya
- Agnyphantes Hull, 1933 – Kazakhstan, China, Russia, Alaska, Canada
- Agyneta Hull, 1911 – Worldwide
- Agyphantes Saaristo & Marusik, 2004 – Russia
- Ainerigone Eskov, 1993 – Japan, Russia
- Alioranus Simon, 1926 – Asia, Cyprus, Greece
- Allomengea Strand, 1912 – Kyrgyzstan, Eastern Asia, Caucasus, Russia, North America
- Allotiso Tanasevitch, 1990 – Georgia, Turkey
- Amfractus Irfan, Zhang & Peng, 2022 – China
- Anacornia Chamberlin & Ivie, 1933 – United States
- Anguliphantes Saaristo & Tanasevitch, 1996 – Asia, Romania, Russia
- Anibontes Chamberlin, 1924 – United States
- Annapolis Millidge, 1984 – North America
- Anodoration Millidge, 1991 – Argentina, Brazil
- Anthrobia Tellkampf, 1844 – North America
- Antrohyphantes Dumitrescu, 1971 – Bulgaria, North Macedonia
- Aperturina Tanasevitch, 2014 – Malaysia, Thailand
- Aphileta Hull, 1920 – Kazakhstan, Russia
- Apobrata Miller, 2004 – Philippines
- Aprifrontalia Oi, 1960 – Eastern Asia, Russia
- Arachosinella Denis, 1958 – Afghanistan, Kazakhstan, Kyrgyzstan, Mongolia, Russia
- Araeoncus Simon, 1884 – Africa, Asia, Europe, North Africa. Introduced to New Zealand
- Archaraeoncus Tanasevitch, 1987 – Asia, Bulgaria, Ukraine, Russia
- Arcterigone Eskov & Marusik, 1994 – Russia, Alaska, Canada
- Arcuphantes Chamberlin & Ivie, 1943 – Eastern Asia, North America
- Ascetophantes Tanasevitch & Saaristo, 2006 – Nepal
- Asemostera Simon, 1898 – Central to South America
- Asiafroneta Tanasevitch, 2020 – Malaysia
- Asiagone Tanasevitch, 2014 – China, Laos, Thailand
- Asiceratinops Eskov, 1992 – Russia
- Asiophantes Eskov, 1993 – Russia
- Asperthorax Oi, 1960 – China, Japan, Russia
- Asthenargellus Caporiacco, 1949 – Kenya
- Asthenargoides Eskov, 1993 – Russia
- Asthenargus Simon & Fage, 1922 – Africa, Asia, Europe
- Atypena Simon, 1894 – Asia
- Auriculaiana Irfan, Zhang & Peng, 2023 – China
- Australolinyphia Wunderlich, 1976 – Australia
- Australophantes Tanasevitch, 2012 – Indonesia, Australia
- Bactrogyna Millidge, 1991 – Chile
- Baryphyma Simon, 1884 – Kazakhstan, Kyrgyzstan, China, Caucasus, Georgia, Europe, Britain, Western
- Baryphymula Eskov, 1992 – Japan
- Bathylinyphia Eskov, 1992 – Kazakhstan, China, Japan, Korea, Russia
- Bathyphantes Menge, 1866 – Angola, Congo, Asia, Europe, Russia, North America, Oceania, Argentina
- Batueta Locket, 1982 – Asia
- Bifurcia Saaristo, Tu & Li, 2006 – China, Russia
- Birgerius Saaristo, 1973 – Spain, France
- Bisetifer Tanasevitch, 1987 – Caucasus, Ukraine, Russia
- Bishopiana Eskov, 1988 – China, Russia
- Blestia Millidge, 1993 – United States
- Bolephthyphantes Strand, 1901 – Central Asia, Caucasus, Russia, France, Greenland
- Bolyphantes C. L. Koch, 1837 – Asia, Europe, Western Mediterranean
- Bordea Bosmans, 1995 – Portugal, Spain, France
- Boreomaro Tanasevitch, 2022 – Russia
- Brachycerasphora Denis, 1962 – Northern Africa, Israel
- Bureyanus Tanasevitch, 2023 – Russia
- Bursellia Holm, 1962 – Cameroon, Congo, Eastern Africa
- Caenonetria Millidge & Russell-Smith, 1992 – Brunei
- Callitrichia Fage, 1936 – Africa, China, Thailand, India
- Callosa Zhao & Li, 2017 – China
- Camafroneta Frick & Scharff, 2018 – Cameroon
- Cameroneta Bosmans & Jocqué, 1983 – Cameroon
- Canariellanum Wunderlich, 1987 – Canary Islands
- Canariphantes Wunderlich, 1992 – Ethiopia, Algeria, Morocco, Tunisia, Israel, Turkey, Europe
- Capsulia Saaristo, Tu & Li, 2006 – China
- Caracladus Simon, 1884 – China, Japan, Austria, Germany, Switzerland, Italy, France, Western
- Carorita Duffey & Merrett, 1963 – China, Ukraine, Russia, Central, Western
- Cassafroneta Blest, 1979 – New Zealand
- Catacercus Millidge, 1985 – Chile
- Catonetria Millidge & Ashmole, 1994 – Ascension Islands
- Caucasopisthes Tanasevitch, 1990 – Caucasus
- Cautinella Millidge, 1985 – Chile
- Caviphantes Oi, 1960 – Asia, Bulgaria, Romania, Ukraine, Russia, North America
- Centromerita Dahl, 1912 – Caucasus, Turkey. Introduced to North America
- Centromerus Dahl, 1886 – North Africa, Asia, Europe, North America
- Centrophantes Miller & Polenec, 1975 – Austria, Slovenia
- Ceraticelus Simon, 1884 – Germany, Poland, Russia, Finland, Netherlands, North America
- Ceratinella Emerton, 1882 – China, Japan, Korea, Caucasus, Iran, Turkey, Russia, Italy, North America, Australia
- Ceratinops Banks, 1905 – North America
- Ceratinopsidis Bishop & Crosby, 1930 – North America
- Ceratinopsis Emerton, 1882 – Africa, Asia, Canary Islands, Madeira, Guatemala, North America
- Ceratocyba Holm, 1962 – Kenya
- Cheniseo Bishop & Crosby, 1935 – North America
- Chenisides Denis, 1962 – Congo, Kenya
- Cherserigone Denis, 1954 – Algeria
- Chiangmaia Millidge, 1995 – Thailand
- Chthiononetes Millidge, 1993 – Australia
- Cinetata Wunderlich, 1995 – Georgia
- Cirrosus Zhao & Li, 2014 – China
- Claviphantes Tanasevitch & Saaristo, 2006 – Nepal
- Cnephalocotes Simon, 1884 – Korea, Ukraine, Russia, Canada, Hawaii
- Collinsia O. Pickard-Cambridge, 1913 – Kyrgyzstan, China, Japan, Korea, Caucasus, Iran, Austria, Russia, Spain, France, North America, Spitsbergen
- Coloncus Chamberlin, 1949 – North America
- Comorella Jocqué, 1985 – Comoros
- Concavocephalus Eskov, 1989 – Russia
- Conglin Zhao & Li, 2014 – China
- Connithorax Eskov, 1993 – Russia
- Coreorgonal Bishop & Crosby, 1935 – North America
- Cornicephalus Saaristo & Wunderlich, 1995 – China
- Cornitibia Lin, Lopardo & Uhl, 2022 – Nepal
- Cresmatoneta Simon, 1929 – Japan, Korea, India, Caucasus, Turkey, Russia
- Crispiphantes Tanasevitch, 1992 – China, Korea, Russia
- Cristatus Irfan, Zhang & Peng, 2022 – China
- Crosbyarachne Charitonov, 1937 – Turkey, Europe
- Crosbylonia Eskov, 1988 – Russia
- Cryptolinyphia Millidge, 1991 – Colombia
- Ctenophysis Millidge, 1985 – Chile
- Curtimeticus Zhao & Li, 2014 – China
- Cyphonetria Millidge, 1995 – Thailand
- Dactylopisthes Simon, 1884 – Asia, Europe, Alaska, Canada
- Dactylopisthoides Eskov, 1990 – Russia
- Decipiphantes Saaristo & Tanasevitch, 1996 – Kazakhstan, Mongolia, Belarus, Russia, Scandinavia
- Deelemania Jocqué & Bosmans, 1983 – Cameroon, Gabon, Malawi, Ivory Coast
- Dendronetria Millidge & Russell-Smith, 1992 – Brunei
- Denisiphantes Tu, Li & Rollard, 2005 – China
- Diastanillus Simon, 1926 – Austria, Norway, France
- Dicornua Oi, 1960 – Japan
- Dicristatus Irfan, Wang & Zhang, 2023 – China
- Dicymbium Menge, 1868 – Asia, Russia, North America
- Didectoprocnemis Denis, 1950 – North Africa, Romania, Greece, Portugal, France
- Diechomma Millidge, 1991 – Colombia
- Diplocentria Hull, 1911 – China, Mongolia, Russia, Europe, North America
- Diplocephaloides Oi, 1960 – China, Japan, Korea
- Diplocephalus Bertkau, 1883 – North Africa, Asia, Europe to Russia, North America, Greenland, Falkland Is
- Diploplecta Millidge, 1988 – New Zealand
- Diplostyla Emerton, 1882 – Korea, Caucasus, Iran, Turkey, Russia. Introduced to St. Helena
- Diplothyron Millidge, 1991 – Central America, Mexico, Colombia, Venezuela
- Disembolus Chamberlin & Ivie, 1933 – North America
- Dismodicus Simon, 1884 – Russia, France, North America
- Doenitzius Oi, 1960 – China, Japan, Korea, Russia
- Dolabritor Millidge, 1991 – Colombia
- Donacochara Simon, 1884 – Angola, Europe to Central Asia
- Drapetisca Menge, 1866 – China, Japan, Caucasus, Russia, North America
- Drepanotylus Holm, 1945 – China, Mongolia, Bulgaria, Russia, Scandinavia
- Dresconella Denis, 1950 – France
- Dubiaranea Mello-Leitão, 1943 – Malaysia, South America
- Dumoga Millidge & Russell-Smith, 1992 – Indonesia
- Dunedinia Millidge, 1988 – Australia, New Zealand
- Eborilaira Eskov, 1989 – Russia
- Eldonnia Tanasevitch, 2008 – Japan, Korea, Russia
- Emenista Simon, 1894 – India
- Emertongone Lin, Lopardo & Uhl, 2022 – North America
- Enguterothrix Denis, 1962 – Congo, Southeast Asia
- Entelecara Simon, 1884 – Algeria, Asia, Europe, North America
- Eordea Simon, 1899 – Indonesia
- Epibellowia Tanasevitch, 1996 – Japan, Russia
- Epiceraticelus Crosby & Bishop, 1931 – United States
- Epigyphantes Saaristo & Tanasevitch, 2004 – Russia
- Epigytholus Tanasevitch, 1996 – Mongolia, Russia
- Episolder Tanasevitch, 1996 – Russia
- Epiwubana Millidge, 1991 – Chile
- Eridantes Crosby & Bishop, 1933 – North America
- Erigokhabarum Tanasevitch, 2022 – Russia
- Erigomicronus Tanasevitch, 2018 – China, Japan, Korea, Russia
- Erigone Audouin, 1826 – Worldwide
- Erigonella Dahl, 1901 – Mongolia, Alps, Bulgaria, Russia, France, North Carpathians
- Erigonoploides Eskov, 1989 – Russia
- Erigonoplus Simon, 1884 – Morocco, Kazakhstan, Turkmenistan, Western Asia, Europe
- Erigonops Scharff, 1990 – South Africa
- Erigophantes Wunderlich, 1995 – Borneo
- Eskovia Marusik & Saaristo, 1999 – Mongolia, Russia, Canada
- Eskovina Kocak & Kemal, 2006 – China, Korea, Russia
- Esophyllas Prentice & Redak, 2012 – United States
- Estrandia Blauvelt, 1936 – China, Japan, Russia
- Eulaira Chamberlin & Ivie, 1933 – North America
- Eurymorion Millidge, 1993 – Bolivia, Brazil
- Evansia O. Pickard-Cambridge, 1901 – Europe, Japan?
- Fageiella Kratochvíl, 1934 – Southern Europe
- Falklandoglenes Usher, 1983 – Falkland Islands
- Fissiscapus Millidge, 1991 – Colombia, Ecuador
- Fistulaphantes Tanasevitch & Saaristo, 2006 – Nepal
- Flagelliphantes Saaristo & Tanasevitch, 1996 – China, Russia
- Floricomus Crosby & Bishop, 1925 – North America
- Florinda O. Pickard-Cambridge, 1896 – Mexico, United States
- Floronia Simon, 1887 – China, Japan, Korea, Russia, Ecuador
- Formiphantes Saaristo & Tanasevitch, 1996 – Europe
- Frederickus Paquin, Dupérré, Buckle & Crawford, 2008 – North America
- Frontella Kulczyński, 1908 – Russia
- Frontinella F. O. Pickard-Cambridge, 1902 – China, Hispaniola, El Salvador, Mexico, United States
- Frontinellina van Helsdingen, 1969 – South Africa, North Africa, Asia, Madeira, Russia
- Frontiphantes Wunderlich, 1987 – Madeira
- Fusciphantes Oi, 1960 – Japan
- Gibbafroneta Merrett, 2004 – Congo
- Gibothorax Eskov, 1989 – Russia
- Gigapassus Miller, 2007 – Argentina
- Gladiata Zhao & Li, 2014 – China
- Glebala Zhao & Li, 2014 – China
- Glomerosus Zhao & Li, 2014 – China
- Glyphesis Simon, 1926 – Japan, Europe, North America
- Gnathonargus Bishop & Crosby, 1935 – United States
- Gnathonarium Karsch, 1881 – Asia, Russia, Alaska, Canada, North Africa
- Gnathonaroides Bishop & Crosby, 1938 – North America
- Gonatium Menge, 1868 – Kenya, Algeria, Morocco, Asia, Europe, North America
- Gonatoraphis Millidge, 1991 – Colombia
- Goneatara Bishop & Crosby, 1935 – North America
- Gongylidiellum Simon, 1884 – Angola, Algeria, Morocco, Asia, Europe, United States, Argentina
- Gongylidioides Oi, 1960 – Asia, Russia
- Gongylidium Menge, 1868 – Kazakhstan, China, Turkey, Russia, Italy
- Gracilentus Irfan, Zhang & Peng, 2022 – China
- Grammonota Emerton, 1882 – North America, Colombia
- Gravipalpus Millidge, 1991 – Argentina, Brazil, Peru
- Habreuresis Millidge, 1991 – Chile
- Halorates Hull, 1911 – Kazakhstan, China, Nepal, Pakistan, North America, Central, Western
- Haplinis Simon, 1894 – Australia, New Zealand
- Haplomaro Miller, 1970 – Angola
- Helophora Menge, 1866 – Kyrgyzstan, China, Caucasus, Russia, North America
- Helsdingenia Saaristo & Tanasevitch, 2003 – Cameroon, Comoros, Madagascar, Nigeria, St. Helena, Indonesia, Nepal, Sri Lanka
- Herbiphantes Tanasevitch, 1992 – China, Japan, Korea, Russia
- Heterolinyphia Wunderlich, 1973 – Bhutan, India, Nepal
- Heterotrichoncus Wunderlich, 1970 – Europe
- Hilaira Simon, 1884 – China, Japan, Mongolia, Nepal, Europe, Russia, North America
- Himalafurca Tanasevitch, 2021 – Nepal
- Himalaphantes Tanasevitch, 1992 – China, Japan, India, Nepal, Russia
- Holma Locket, 1974 – Angola
- Holmelgonia Jocqué & Scharff, 2007 – Africa
- Holminaria Eskov, 1991 – China, Mongolia, Russia
- Horcotes Crosby & Bishop, 1933 – Russia, Scandinavia, North America
- Houshenzinus Tanasevitch, 2006 – China
- Hubertella Platnick, 1989 – Nepal
- Hybauchenidium Holm, 1973 – Mongolia, Russia, Finland, Sweden, North America
- Hybocoptus Simon, 1884 – Algeria, Morocco, France
- Hylyphantes Simon, 1884 – Asia, Russia
- Hyperafroneta Blest, 1979 – New Zealand
- Hypomma Dahl, 1886 – Equatorial Guinea, Kazakhstan, Kyrgyzstan, China, Japan, Turkey, Russia, North Macedonia, North America, New Caledonia
- Hypselistes Simon, 1894 – Kazakhstan, Eastern Asia, Russia, North America
- Hypselocara Millidge, 1991 – Venezuela
- Ibadana Locket & Russell-Smith, 1980 – Cameroon, Nigeria
- Iberoneta Deeleman-Reinhold, 1984 – Spain
- Icariella Brignoli, 1979 – Greece
- Idionella Banks, 1893 – North America
- Improphantes Saaristo & Tanasevitch, 1996 – Kenya, Asia, Europe, North Africa
- Incestophantes Tanasevitch, 1992 – Kazakhstan, China, Mongolia, Georgia, Alps, Russia, Scandinavia, North America
- Indophantes Saaristo & Tanasevitch, 2003 – China, Indonesia, Malaysia, India, Nepal, Pakistan
- Intecymbium Miller, 2007 – Argentina, Chile
- Ipa Saaristo, 2007 – Kazakhstan, Turkmenistan, Mongolia, Caucasus, Turkey, Europe
- Ipaoides Tanasevitch, 2008 – China
- Islandiana Brændegaard, 1932 – Russia, Iceland, North America
- Ivielum Eskov, 1988 – Mongolia, Russia, Canada
- Jacksonella Millidge, 1951 – Korea, Cyprus, Greece, central Europe, Northern, western
- Jalapyphantes Gertsch & Davis, 1946 – Dominican Republic, Mexico, Colombia
- Janetschekia Schenkel, 1939 – Austria, Germany, Switzerland, Albania, Italy, France
- Javagone Tanasevitch, 2020 – Indonesia
- Javanaria Tanasevitch, 2020 – Indonesia
- Javanyphia Tanasevitch, 2020 – Indonesia
- Jilinus Lin, Lopardo & Uhl, 2022 – China, Korea, Russia
- Johorea Locket, 1982 – Malaysia, Singapore
- Juanfernandezia Koçak & Kemal, 2008 – Chile
- Kaestneria Wiehle, 1956 – China, Japan, Mongolia, Indonesia, Czechia, Poland, Slovakia, Romania, Ukraine, Russia, North America
- Kagurargus Ono, 2007 – Japan
- Kalimagone Tanasevitch, 2017 – Malaysia
- Karita Tanasevitch, 2007 – Germany, Poland, Russia, Ireland, Scandinavia, Belgium, Britain
- Kenocymbium Millidge & Russell-Smith, 1992 – Indonesia, Malaysia, Thailand
- Ketambea Millidge & Russell-Smith, 1992 – Asia, Russia
- Kikimora Eskov, 1988 – Russia, Finland, Norway
- Knischatiria Wunderlich, 1976 – Indonesia, Malaysia, Australia
- Koinothrix Jocqué, 1981 – Cape Verde
- Kolymocyba Eskov, 1989 – Russia
- Kratochviliella Miller, 1938 – Bulgaria, Greece, North Macedonia, France
- Labicymbium Millidge, 1991 – South America
- Labulla Simon, 1884 – Portugal, Spain, France
- Labullinyphia van Helsdingen, 1985 – China, Sri Lanka
- Labullula Strand, 1913 – Angola, Cameroon, Comoros
- Laetesia Simon, 1908 – Thailand, Australia, Vanuatu, New Zealand
- Lamellasia Tanasevitch, 2014 – Thailand
- Laminacauda Millidge, 1985 – Panama, South America
- Laminafroneta Merrett, 2004 – Cameroon, Congo, Eastern Africa
- Laogone Tanasevitch, 2014 – China, Laos
- Laperousea Dalmas, 1917 – Australia, New Zealand
- Lasiargus Kulczyński, 1894 – Kazakhstan, Kyrgyzstan, Mongolia, Russia
- Lenis Irfan, Zhang & Peng, 2025 – China
- Lepthyphantes Menge, 1866 – Africa, Asia, Europe, Puerto Rico, Brazil, Chile, North America, New Caledonia
- Leptorhoptrum Kulczyński, 1894 – Japan, Russia
- Leptothrix Menge, 1869 – Europe
- Lessertia Smith, 1908 – Algeria, Morocco, Turkey, Canary Islands, Madeira, Italy, Spain. Introduced to Canada, New Zealand
- Lessertinella Denis, 1947 – Alps, Slovakia, Romania, North Macedonia
- Lidia Saaristo & Marusik, 2004 – Kazakhstan, Kyrgyzstan
- Limoneta Bosmans & Jocqué, 1983 – Cameroon, Kenya, South Africa
- Linyphantes Chamberlin & Ivie, 1942 – North America
- Linyphia Latreille, 1804 – Algeria, Morocco, Asia, United States to South America, Australia, Cook Islands, Samoa
- Locketidium Jocqué, 1981 – Kenya, Malawi, Tanzania
- Locketiella Millidge & Russell-Smith, 1992 – Brunei, Indonesia
- Locketina Kocak & Kemal, 2006 – Brunei, Malaysia
- Lomaita Bryant, 1948 – Dominican Republic
- Lophomma Menge, 1868 – Russia, North America
- Lotusiphantes Chen & Yin, 2001 – China
- Lucrinus O. Pickard-Cambridge, 1904 – South Africa
- Lutosus Irfan, Zhang & Peng, 2022 – China
- Lygarina Simon, 1894 – South America
- Machadocara Miller, 1970 – Congo, Kenya, Zambia
- Macrargus Dahl, 1886 – China, Mongolia, Europe
- Maculoncus Wunderlich, 1995 – Taiwan, Caucasus, Israel, Cyprus, Greece
- Malkinola Miller, 2007 – Chile
- Mansuphantes Saaristo & Tanasevitch, 1996 – Caucasus, Turkey, Europe
- Maorineta Millidge, 1988 – Marshall Islands, New Zealand, Cook Islands
- Maro O. Pickard-Cambridge, 1907 – Japan, Mongolia, Russia, North America
- Martensinus Wunderlich, 1973 – Nepal
- Masikia Millidge, 1984 – Russia, North America
- Maso Simon, 1884 – Asia, Russia, Portugal, Alaska, United States
- Masoncus Chamberlin, 1949 – North America
- Masonetta Chamberlin & Ivie, 1939 – United States
- Mecopisthes Simon, 1926 – Algeria, Morocco, Turkmenistan, China, Japan, Caucasus, Israel, Europe
- Mecynargoides Eskov, 1988 – Mongolia, Russia
- Mecynargus Kulczyński, 1894 – Kazakhstan, Kyrgyzstan, China, Mongolia, Europe, Alaska, Canada, Greenland
- Mecynidis Simon, 1894 – Angola, Kenya, Tanzania, South Africa
- Megafroneta Blest, 1979 – New Zealand
- Megalepthyphantes Wunderlich, 1994 – Algeria, Morocco, Asia, Russia, Cyprus, Greece
- Mermessus O. Pickard-Cambridge, 1899 – China, Japan, Korea, Russia, North America, South America. Introduced worldwide
- Mesasigone Tanasevitch, 1989 – Kazakhstan, China, Iran, Russia
- Metafroneta Blest, 1979 – New Zealand
- Metaleptyphantes Locket, 1968 – Africa, Indonesia
- Metamynoglenes Blest, 1979 – New Zealand
- Metapanamomops Millidge, 1977 – Finland
- Metopobactrus Simon, 1884 – Japan, Korea, Caucasus, Turkey, Europe, Canada
- Micrargpelecopsis Wunderlich, 2025 – Portugal
- Micrargus Dahl, 1886 – Uganda, Europe, Asia, North America, North Africa
- Microbathyphantes van Helsdingen, 1985 – Angola, Cameroon, Seychelles, Nigeria, Asia
- Microctenonyx Dahl, 1886 – Nigeria, Italy, Macaronesia, North Africa to Kyrgyzstan. Introduced worldwide
- Microcyba Holm, 1962 – Africa
- Microlinyphia Gerhardt, 1928 – Africa, Asia, Russia, North America
- Microneta Menge, 1869 – Asia, Russia, Sweden, United States to Brazil, New Guinea, North Africa
- Microplanus Millidge, 1991 – Panama, Colombia
- Midia Saaristo & Wunderlich, 1995 – Europe
- Miftengris Eskov, 1993 – Russia
- Millidgea Locket, 1968 – Angola
- Millidgella Kammerer, 2006 – Argentina, Chile
- Minicia Thorell, 1875 – Algeria, Kazakhstan, Western Asia, Europe
- Minyriolus Simon, 1884 – Caucasus, Austria, Russia, Croatia, Italy, France, Argentina
- Mioxena Simon, 1926 – Angola, Congo, Kenya
- Mitrager van Helsdingen, 1985 – Indonesia, India, Nepal
- Moebelia Dahl, 1886 – China, Caucasus, Germany, France
- Moebelotinus Wunderlich, 1995 – Mongolia, Russia
- Molestia Tu, Saaristo & Li, 2006 – China, France
- Monocephalus Smith, 1906 – Europe
- Monocerellus Tanasevitch, 1983 – Russia
- Montilaira Chamberlin, 1921 – North America
- Moreiraxena Miller, 1970 – Angola
- Moyosi Miller, 2007 – Argentina, Brazil, Guyana
- Mughiphantes Saaristo & Tanasevitch, 1999 – Asia, Europe
- Murphydium Jocqué, 1996 – Kenya, Somalia
- Mycula Schikora, 1994 – Austria, Germany, Italy
- Myrmecomelix Millidge, 1993 – Ecuador, Peru
- Mythoplastoides Crosby & Bishop, 1933 – North America
- Napometa Benoit, 1977 – St. Helena
- Nasoona Locket, 1982 – Asia, Venezuela
- Nasoonaria Wunderlich & Song, 1995 – China, Southeast Asia
- Nematogmus Simon, 1884 – Asia, Russia, North Africa
- Nenilinium Eskov, 1988 – Mongolia, Russia
- Nentwigia Millidge, 1995 – Indonesia, Thailand
- Neocautinella Baert, 1990 – South America
- Neodietrichia Özdikmen, 2008 – North America
- Neoeburnella Koçak, 1986 – Ivory Coast
- Neomaso Forster, 1970 – South America
- Neonesiotes Millidge, 1991 – Oceania
- Neriene Blackwall, 1833 – Africa, Asia, Europe, North America, Brazil, Uruguay
- Neserigone Eskov, 1992 – Japan, Russia
- Nesioneta Millidge, 1991 – Asia, Oceania, United Arab Emirates
- Nihonella Ballarin & Yamasaki, 2021 – Japan
- Nippononeta Eskov, 1992 – Eastern Asia, Russia
- Nipponotusukuru Saito & Ono, 2001 – Japan
- Nispa Eskov, 1993 – Japan, Russia
- Notholepthyphantes Millidge, 1985 – Chile
- Nothophantes Merrett & Stevens, 1995 – Britain
- Notiogyne Tanasevitch, 2007 – Russia
- Notiohyphantes Millidge, 1985 – Brazil, Chile, Galapagos
- Notiomaso Banks, 1914 – Argentina, Chile
- Notioscopus Simon, 1884 – South Africa, China, Mongolia, Russia
- Notolinga Lavery & Dupérré, 2019 – Argentina
- Novafroneta Blest, 1979 – New Zealand
- Novafrontina Millidge, 1991 – Colombia, Ecuador, Peru
- Novalaetesia Millidge, 1988 – New Zealand
- Nusoncus Wunderlich, 2008 – Europe
- Oaphantes Chamberlin & Ivie, 1943 – North America
- Obrimona Strand, 1934 – Sri Lanka
- Obscuriphantes Saaristo & Tanasevitch, 2000 – Kazakhstan, China, Caucasus, Turkey, Russia, Southern Europe
- Oculocornia Oliger, 1985 – Russia
- Oedothorax Bertkau, 1883 – Ethiopia, Asia, Europe, North America, North Africa
- Oia Wunderlich, 1973 – Asia, Russia
- Oilinyphia Ono & Saito, 1989 – China, Japan, Thailand
- Oilinyphioides Irfan, Zhang & Peng, 2025 – China
- Okhotigone Eskov, 1993 – China, Japan, Russia
- Onychembolus Millidge, 1985 – Argentina, Chile
- Oreocyba Holm, 1962 – Kenya, Uganda
- Oreoneta Kulczyński, 1894 – Kazakhstan, China, Mongolia, Europe, North America
- Oreonetides Strand, 1901 – China, Japan, Taiwan, Europe, North America
- Oreophantes Eskov, 1984 – North America
- Orfeo Miller, 2007 – Brazil
- Origanates Crosby & Bishop, 1933 – United States
- Orsonwelles Hormiga, 2002 – Hawaii
- Oryphantes Hull, 1933 – Kazakhstan, Russia, North America
- Ostearius Hull, 1911 – China. Introduced to Africa, Indonesia, Malaysia, Canada, New Zealand
- Ouedia Bosmans & Abrous, 1992 – Algeria, Tunisia, Southern Europe
- Pachydelphus Jocqué & Bosmans, 1983 – Gabon, Ivory Coast, Sierra Leone
- Pacifiphantes Eskov & Marusik, 1994 – China, Korea, Russia, North America
- Pahangone Tanasevitch, 2018 – Malaysia
- Paikiniana Eskov, 1992 – China, Japan, Korea
- Palaeohyphantes Millidge, 1984 – Australia
- Palliduphantes Saaristo & Tanasevitch, 2001 – North Africa, Kyrgyzstan, Nepal, Caucasus, Iran, Turkey, Europe
- Panamomops Simon, 1884 – Kazakhstan, Kyrgyzstan, Pakistan, Caucasus, Europe
- Paracornicularia Crosby & Bishop, 1931 – United States
- Paracymboides Tanasevitch, 2011 – India
- Paraeboria Eskov, 1990 – Russia
- Parafroneta Blest, 1979 – New Zealand
- Paraglyphesis Eskov, 1991 – Russia
- Paragongylidiellum Wunderlich, 1973 – India, Nepal
- Paraletes Millidge, 1991 – Brazil, Peru
- Parameioneta Locket, 1982 – China, Southeast Asia
- Parapelecopsis Wunderlich, 1992 – Georgia, Madeira, Portugal, France, Britain
- Parasisis Eskov, 1984 – China, Japan, Korea, Russia
- Paratapinocyba Saito, 1986 – Japan
- Paratmeticus Marusik & Koponen, 2010 – Japan, Russia
- Parawubanoides Eskov & Marusik, 1992 – Mongolia, Russia
- Parbatthorax Tanasevitch, 2019 – China, Nepal
- Parhypomma Eskov, 1992 – Japan
- Paro Berland, 1942 – French Polynesia
- Parvunaria Tanasevitch, 2018 – Myanmar
- Patagoneta Millidge, 1985 – Chile
- Pecado Hormiga & Scharff, 2005 – Algeria, Morocco, Spain
- Pelecopsidis Bishop & Crosby, 1935 – United States
- Pelecopsis Simon, 1864 – Africa, Asia, Europe, North America
- Peponocranium Simon, 1884 – Mongolia, Georgia, Europe
- Perlongipalpus Eskov & Marusik, 1991 – Mongolia, Russia
- Perregrinus Tanasevitch, 1992 – China, Mongolia, Russia, Canada
- Perro Tanasevitch, 1992 – Russia, Canada
- Phanetta Keyserling, 1886 – United States
- Phyllarachne Millidge & Russell-Smith, 1992 – Brunei
- Piesocalus Simon, 1894 – Indonesia
- Piniphantes Saaristo & Tanasevitch, 1996 – Asia, Alps, France
- Pityohyphantes Simon, 1929 – Kazakhstan, Japan, Russia, North America
- Plaesianillus Simon, 1926 – France
- Platyspira Song & Li, 2009 – China
- Plectembolus Millidge & Russell-Smith, 1992 – Indonesia, Malaysia, Philippines
- Plesiophantes Heimer, 1981 – Caucasus, Georgia, Turkey, Russia
- Plicatiductus Millidge & Russell-Smith, 1992 – Indonesia
- Pocadicnemis Simon, 1884 – Asia, Russia, Southern Europe, North America
- Pocobletus Simon, 1894 – North to South America
- Poecilafroneta Blest, 1979 – New Zealand
- Poeciloneta Kulczyński, 1894 – Kazakhstan, Kyrgyzstan, China, Georgia, Iran, Russia, North America
- Porrhomma Simon, 1884 – Asia, Europe, North America
- Praestigia Millidge, 1954 – Japan, Mongolia, Europe, Alaska, Canada, Greenland
- Primerigonina Wunderlich, 1995 – Panama
- Prinerigone Millidge, 1988 – Africa, Asia
- Procerocymbium Eskov, 1989 – Russia, Canada
- Proelauna Jocqué, 1981 – Angola, Malawi, Tanzania
- Proislandiana Tanasevitch, 1985 – Armenia, Turkey, Russia
- Promynoglenes Blest, 1979 – New Zealand
- Pronasoona Millidge, 1995 – Malaysia, Thailand
- Prosoponoides Millidge & Russell-Smith, 1992 – China, Southeast Asia, India
- Protoerigone Blest, 1979 – New Zealand
- Protopalpus Tanasevitch, 2021 – Thailand
- Protosintula Tanasevitch, 2021 – Israel
- Pseudafroneta Blest, 1979 – New Zealand
- Pseudocarorita Wunderlich, 1980 – Central Europe
- Pseudocyba Tanasevitch, 1984 – Kazakhstan, Russia
- Pseudohilaira Eskov, 1990 – Russia
- Pseudomaro Denis, 1966 – Europe
- Pseudomaso Locket & Russell-Smith, 1980 – Nigeria
- Pseudomicrargus Eskov, 1992 – Japan
- Pseudomicrocentria Miller, 1970 – Africa, Malaysia, Singapore
- Pseudoporrhomma Eskov, 1993 – Russia
- Pseudotapinopa Wunderlich, 2024 – Ecuador
- Pseudotyphistes Brignoli, 1972 – South America
- Pseudowubana Eskov & Marusik, 1992 – Mongolia, Russia
- Psilocymbium Millidge, 1991 – South America
- Putaoa Hormiga & Tu, 2008 – China, Taiwan
- Racata Millidge, 1995 – Indonesia, Thailand
- Rhabdogyna Millidge, 1985 – Chile
- Ringina Tambs-Lyche, 1954 – Crozet Islands
- Russocampus Tanasevitch, 2004 – Caucasus, Ukraine, Russia
- Ryojius Saito & Ono, 2001 – China, Japan, Korea
- Saaristoa Millidge, 1978 – Japan, North America
- Sachaliphantes Saaristo & Tanasevitch, 2004 – China, Japan, Korea, Russia
- Saitonia Eskov, 1992 – China, Japan, Korea
- Saloca Simon, 1926 – Nepal, Turkey, Russia, Central
- Satilatlas Keyserling, 1886 – Russia, North America, Central, Western
- Sauron Eskov, 1995 – Kazakhstan, Turkey, Russia
- Savignia Blackwall, 1833 – Comoros, Ethiopia, Algeria, Kazakhstan, East Asia, Caucasus, Russia, Europe, Canada, Australia
- Savigniorrhipis Wunderlich, 1992 – Azores
- Scandichrestus Wunderlich, 1995 – Russia, Estonia, Finland, Sweden
- Sciastes Bishop & Crosby, 1938 – Austria, Switzerland, Russia, Italy, France, North America
- Scirites Bishop & Crosby, 1938 – North America
- Scironis Bishop & Crosby, 1938 – North America
- Scolecura Millidge, 1991 – Argentina, Brazil, Colombia
- Scolopembolus Bishop & Crosby, 1938 – North America
- Scotargus Simon, 1913 – Algeria, Morocco, Kazakhstan, Nepal, Caucasus, Iran, Canary Islands, Russia
- Scotinotylus Simon, 1884 – Kazakhstan, China, Japan?, Mongolia, Europe, North America
- Scutpelecopsis Marusik & Gnelitsa, 2009 – Caucasus, Iran, Turkey, Bulgaria, Romania, Southern Europe
- Scylaceus Bishop & Crosby, 1938 – North America
- Scyletria Bishop & Crosby, 1938 – North America
- Selenyphantes Gertsch & Davis, 1946 – Costa Rica, Guatemala, Mexico
- Semljicola Strand, 1906 – Kazakhstan, China, Mongolia, Russia, Norway, Scandinavia, North America, Britain
- Sengletus Tanasevitch, 2008 – Egypt, Iran, Israel
- Shaanxinus Tanasevitch, 2006 – China, Taiwan, Vietnam, Russia
- Shanus Tanasevitch, 2006 – China
- Sibirocyba Eskov & Marusik, 1994 – Russia
- Silometopoides Eskov, 1990 – Kazakhstan, Eastern Asia, Russia, North America
- Silometopus Simon, 1926 – Egypt?, Kazakhstan, China, Japan, Iran, Israel, Europe
- Simplicistilus Locket, 1968 – Angola, Democratic Republic of the Congo, Nigeria
- Singatrichona Tanasevitch, 2019 – Singapore
- Sinisterigone Irfan, Zhang & Peng, 2022 – China
- Sinogone Irfan, Wang & Zhang, 2023 – China
- Sinolinyphia Wunderlich & Li, 1995 – China, Russia
- Sinopimoa Li & Wunderlich, 2008 – China
- Sintula Simon, 1884 – Algeria, Morocco, Tunisia, Western Asia, Europe
- Sisicottus Bishop & Crosby, 1938 – Russia, North America
- Sisicus Bishop & Crosby, 1938 – Europe, Russia, North America
- Sisis Bishop & Crosby, 1938 – North America
- Sisyrbe Bishop & Crosby, 1938 – United States
- Sitalcas Bishop & Crosby, 1938 – United States
- Smerasia Zhao & Li, 2014 – China
- Smermisia Simon, 1894 – Costa Rica, South America
- Smodix Bishop & Crosby, 1938 – North America
- Solenysa Simon, 1894 – Eastern Asia
- Soucron Crosby & Bishop, 1936 – North America
- Souessa Crosby & Bishop, 1936 – North America
- Souessoula Crosby & Bishop, 1936 – North America
- Sougambus Crosby & Bishop, 1936 – North America
- Souidas Crosby & Bishop, 1936 – North America
- Soulgas Crosby & Bishop, 1936 – North America
- Spanioplanus Millidge, 1991 – South America
- Spelaeus Irfan, Zhang & Peng, 2025 – China
- Sphecozone O. Pickard-Cambridge, 1871 – Trinidad, United States, South America
- Spiralophantes Tanasevitch & Saaristo, 2006 – Nepal
- Spirembolus Chamberlin, 1920 – North America
- Staveleya Sherwood, 2021 – Switzerland, Ukraine, Italy, France
- Stemonyphantes Menge, 1866 – Asia, Ukraine, Russia, Italy, Slovenia, France, North America
- Sthelota Simon, 1894 – Guatemala, Panama
- Stictonanus Millidge, 1991 – Chile, Falkland Islands
- Strandella Oi, 1960 – China, Japan, Korea, Russia
- Strongyliceps Fage, 1936 – Kenya, Uganda
- Styloctetor Simon, 1884 – Asia, Alps, Russia, North America, North Africa
- Subbekasha Millidge, 1984 – Canada
- Syedra Simon, 1884 – DR Congo, China, Japan, Korea, Europe
- Symmigma Crosby & Bishop, 1933 – North America
- Tachygyna Chamberlin & Ivie, 1939 – North America
- Taibainus Tanasevitch, 2006 – China
- Taibaishanus Tanasevitch, 2006 – China
- Tallusia Lehtinen & Saaristo, 1972 – Kazakhstan, China, Japan, Caucasus, Turkey, Russia, Greece, Italy
- Tanasevitchia Marusik & Saaristo, 1999 – Russia
- Tapinocyba Simon, 1884 – Algeria, Morocco, Asia, Europe, North America
- Tapinocyboides Wiehle, 1960 – India, Russia
- Tapinopa Westring, 1851 – Algeria, Asia, Russia, Southern Europe, North America
- Taranucnus Simon, 1884 – Japan, Turkey, Poland, Slovakia, Romania, Ukraine, Russia, North America
- Tarsiphantes Strand, 1905 – Russia, Alaska, Canada, Greenland
- Tchatkalophantes Tanasevitch, 2001 – Kazakhstan, Kyrgyzstan, China, Mongolia, Pakistan
- Tegulinus Tanasevitch, 2017 – Indonesia
- Tennesseellum Petrunkevitch, 1925 – Bonaire, North America. Introduced to Marshall Islands
- Tenuiphantes Saaristo & Tanasevitch, 1996 – Tanzania, Algeria, Asia, Europe, North America, Balkans?. Introduced to New Zealand, Argentina, Chile, Falkland Is
- Ternatus Sun, Li & Tu, 2012 – China
- Tessamoro Eskov, 1993 – Russia
- Thainetes Millidge, 1995 – Thailand
- Thaiphantes Millidge, 1995 – Thailand
- Thaleria Tanasevitch, 1984 – Russia, Alaska
- Thapsagus Simon, 1894 – Madagascar
- Thaumatoncus Simon, 1884 – Algeria, Tunisia, Israel, Italy, Spain, France
- Theoa Saaristo, 1995 – Seychelles, China, Southeast Asia
- Theoneta Eskov & Marusik, 1991 – Russia
- Theonina Simon, 1929 – Caucasus, Georgia?, Israel, Ukraine, Russia, Central Europe to Greece, North Africa
- Thyreobaeus Simon, 1889 – Madagascar
- Thyreosthenius Simon, 1884 – Caucasus, Russia
- Tibiaster Tanasevitch, 1987 – Kazakhstan, Russia
- Tibioploides Eskov & Marusik, 1991 – China, Japan, Russia, Estonia, Scandinavia, Alaska
- Tibioplus Chamberlin & Ivie, 1947 – Kyrgyzstan, Mongolia, Russia, Scandinavia, Alaska, Canada
- Tiso Simon, 1884 – Asia, Madeira, Russia, Canada, Greenland
- Tmeticodes Ono, 2010 – Japan
- Tmeticus Menge, 1868 – Eastern Asia, Russia, North America
- Tojinium Saito & Ono, 2001 – Japan
- Toltecaria Miller, 2007 – Mexico
- Tomohyphantes Millidge, 1995 – Indonesia
- Totua Keyserling, 1891 – Brazil
- Trachyneta Holm, 1968 – Congo, Malawi
- Traematosisis Bishop & Crosby, 1938 – North America
- Trematocephalus Dahl, 1886 – China, Sri Lanka, Caucasus, Iran, Turkey, Russia, France
- Trichobactrus Wunderlich, 1995 – Mongolia, Russia
- Trichoncoides Denis, 1950 – Kazakhstan, Caucasus, Iran, Turkey, Russia, France, North Africa
- Trichoncus Simon, 1884 – Kenya, North Africa, Kazakhstan, China, Western Asia, Europe
- Trichoncyboides Wunderlich, 2008 – Bulgaria, Romania, Italy, France
- Trichopterna Kulczyński, 1894 – Tanzania, Algeria, Morocco, Caucasus, Turkey, Russia, Southern Europe
- Trichopternoides Wunderlich, 2008 – Russia
- Triplogyna Millidge, 1991 – Argentina, Brazil, Colombia
- Troglohyphantes Joseph, 1882 – Algeria, Tunisia, Western Asia, Europe
- Troxochrota Kulczyński, 1894 – Germany, Switzerland, Romania, Russia, Estonia, Scandinavia
- Troxochrus Simon, 1884 – Angola, Caucasus, Israel, Turkey, Russia, Sweden, Greece
- Tubercithorax Eskov, 1988 – Russia
- Tunagyna Chamberlin & Ivie, 1933 – Russia, North America
- Turbinellina Millidge, 1993 – Argentina, Chile
- Turinyphia van Helsdingen, 1982 – China, Japan, Korea, Azores, Madeira, Alps
- Tusukuru Eskov, 1993 – Russia, North America
- Tutaibo Chamberlin, 1916 – Guatemala, Mexico, United States, South America
- Tybaertiella Jocqué, 1979 – Ethiopia, Ivory Coast, Nigeria, East Africa, Central, West
- Typhistes Simon, 1894 – Ethiopia, Sri Lanka
- Typhlonyphia Kratochvíl, 1936 – Croatia
- Typhochrestinus Eskov, 1990 – Russia
- Typhochrestoides Eskov, 1990 – Russia
- Typhochrestus Simon, 1884 – Northern Africa, Caucasus, Israel, Turkey, Europe, North America
- Uahuka Berland, 1935 – Marquesas Islands
- Uapou Berland, 1935 – Marquesas Islands
- Ulugurella Jocqué & Scharff, 1986 – Tanzania
- Ummeliata Strand, 1942 – Asia, Russia
- Uralophantes Esyunin, 1992 – Ukraine, Russia
- Ussurigone Eskov, 1993 – Russia
- Vagiphantes Saaristo & Tanasevitch, 2004 – Central Asia, Pakistan
- Venia Seyfulina & Jocqué, 2009 – Kenya
- Vermontia Millidge, 1984 – Russia, North America
- Vesicapalpus Millidge, 1991 – Argentina, Brazil
- Vietnagone Tanasevitch, 2019 – China, Vietnam
- Viktorium Eskov, 1988 – Russia
- Vittatus Zhao & Li, 2014 – China
- Wabasso Millidge, 1984 – Russia, Iceland, Scandinavia, North America, Britain
- Walckenaeria Blackwall, 1833 – Africa, Asia, Europe, North America, Colombia
- Walckenaerianus Wunderlich, 1995 – Kazakhstan, Mongolia, Bulgaria, Russia
- Weintrauboa Hormiga, 2003 – China, Japan, Russia
- Wiehlea Braun, 1959 – Germany, Spain, Belgium, France, Britain
- Wiehlenarius Eskov, 1990 – Austria, Switzerland, Russia, Greece, Italy
- Wubana Chamberlin, 1919 – North America
- Wubanoides Eskov, 1986 – Japan, Mongolia, Czechia, Germany, Russia
- Wulinggone Irfan, Zhang & Peng, 2025 – China
- Wulingnus Irfan, Zhang & Peng, 2025 – China
- Wuliphantes Irfan, Wang & Zhang, 2023 – China
- Xim Ibarra-Núñez, Chamé-Vázquez & Maya-Morales, 2021 – Mexico
- Yakutopus Eskov, 1990 – Russia
- Yuelushannus Irfan, Zhou, Bashir, Mukhtar & Peng, 2020 – China
- Zerogone Eskov & Marusik, 1994 – Russia
- Zhezhoulinyphia Irfan, Zhou & Peng, 2019 – China
- Zilephus Simon, 1902 – Argentina
- Zornella Jackson, 1932 – Kazakhstan, Mongolia, Poland, Belarus, Russia, Estonia, Lithuania, Scandinavia, North America
- Zygottus Chamberlin, 1949 – North America

Extinct

- Lamellaphantes Wunderlich, 2026 – Baltic Amber – Eocene
