= A. F. Millidge =

British arachnologist (1914–2012)

Alfred Frank Millidge (1914 – 16 April 2012) was a British arachnologist who specialised in the spider family Linyphiidae. He co-authored the influential three-volume work British Spiders with G. H. Locket and conducted extensive taxonomic research on North American and South American linyphiid spiders.

== Career and research ==
Millidge conducted research at the American Museum of Natural History, where he published numerous taxonomic studies on linyphiid spiders. His work focused particularly on the subfamily Erigoninae, and he published a comprehensive series on the erigonine spiders of North America in the Journal of Arachnology between 1980 and 1987.

His taxonomic work included detailed revisions of several genera, including studies of Walckenaeria, Eperigone, Spirembolus, and Disembolus.

Millidge also worked extensively on South American linyphiid fauna. His 1985 study described numerous species from Chile and other South American regions, and his 1991 monograph on South American linyphiids was published in the Bulletin of the American Museum of Natural History.

== British Spiders ==
Millidge co-authored the three-volume series British Spiders with G. H. Locket, with the first volume published in 1951 and the second in 1953. A third volume was later published in 1974 with Peter Merrett as an additional co-author.

== British Arachnological Society ==
Millidge was involved with the British Arachnological Society, which originated from spider identification courses that he and G. H. Locket conducted in the 1950s. The society was formally established in 1958 and grew from the earlier Flatford Mill Spider Group.
