= List of Linyphiidae species (Q–Z) =

This article lists all described species of the spider family Linyphiidae as of May 14, 2020, from Q to Z. Some genera have been updated to the World Spider Catalog version 21.0 as of May 2020.

== Racata ==
Racata Millidge, 1995

- Racata brevis Tanasevitch, 2019 — Indonesia
- Racata grata Millidge, 1995 — Krakatau
- Racata laxa Tanasevitch, 2019 — Indonesia
- Racata sumatera Tanasevitch, 2019 — Indonesia

== Rhabdogyna ==
Rhabdogyna Millidge, 1985

- Rhabdogyna chiloensis Millidge, 1985 — Chile
- Rhabdogyna patagonica (Tullgren, 1901) — Chile

== Ringina ==
Ringina Tambs-Lyche, 1954

- Ringina antarctica (Hickman, 1939) — Crozet Islands

== Russocampus ==
Russocampus Tanasevitch, 2004

- Russocampus polchaninovae Tanasevitch, 2004 — Russia

== Ryojius ==
Ryojius Saito & Ono, 2001

- Ryojius japonicus Saito & Ono, 2001 — Japan
- Ryojius nanyuensis (Chen & Yin, 2000) — China
- Ryojius occidentalis Saito & Ono, 2001 — Japan

== Saaristoa ==
Saaristoa Millidge, 1978

- Saaristoa abnormis (Blackwall, 1841) — Palearctic
- Saaristoa ebinoensis (Oi, 1979) — Japan
- Saaristoa firma (O. P.-Cambridge, 1905) — Europe
- Saaristoa nipponica (Saito, 1984) — Japan
- Saaristoa sammamish (Levi & Levi, 1955) — USA

== Sachaliphantes ==
Sachaliphantes Saaristo & Tanasevitch, 2004

- Sachaliphantes sachalinensis (Tanasevitch, 1988) — Russia, China, Japan

== Saitonia ==
Saitonia Eskov, 1992

- Saitonia kawaguchikonis Saito & Ono, 2001 — Japan
- Saitonia longicephala (Saito, 1988) — Japan
- Saitonia muscus (Saito, 1989) — Japan
- Saitonia ojiroensis (Saito, 1990) — Japan
- Saitonia orientalis (Oi, 1960) — Japan
- Saitonia pilosus Seo, 2011 — Korea

== Saloca ==
Saloca Simon, 1926

- Saloca diceros (O. P.-Cambridge, 1871) — Europe
- Saloca elevata Wunderlich, 2011 — Turkey
- Saloca gorapaniensis Wunderlich, 1983 — Nepal
- Saloca khumbuensis Wunderlich, 1983 — Nepal
- Saloca kulczynskii Miller & Kratochvil, 1939 — Central, Eastern Europe
- Saloca ryvkini Eskov & Marusik, 1994 — Russia

== Satilatlas ==
Satilatlas Keyserling, 1886

- Satilatlas arenarius (Emerton, 1911) — USA, Canada
- Satilatlas britteni (Jackson, 1913) — Europe
- Satilatlas carens Millidge, 1981 — Canada
- Satilatlas gentilis Millidge, 1981 — USA
- Satilatlas gertschi Millidge, 1981 — Canada
- Satilatlas insolens Millidge, 1981 — USA
- Satilatlas marxi Keyserling, 1886 — Russia, Alaska, Canada
  - Satilatlas marxi matanuskae (Chamberlin, 1949) — Alaska
- Satilatlas monticola Millidge, 1981 — USA

== Sauron ==
Sauron Eskov, 1995

- Sauron fissocornis Eskov, 1995 — Russia, Kazakhstan
- Sauron rayi (Simon, 1881) — Europe

== Savignia ==
Savignia Blackwall, 1833

- Savignia amurensis Eskov, 1991 — Russia
- Savignia badzhalensis Eskov, 1991 — Russia
- Savignia basarukini Eskov, 1988 — Russia
- Savignia birostrum (Chamberlin & Ivie, 1947) — Russia, China, Alaska
- Savignia borea Eskov, 1988 — Russia
- Savignia bureensis Tanasevitch & Trilikauskas, 2006 — Russia
- Savignia centrasiatica Eskov, 1991 — Russia
- Savignia erythrocephala (Simon, 1908) — Western Australia
- Savignia eskovi Marusik, Koponen & Danilov, 2001 — Russia
- Savignia frontata Blackwall, 1833 — Palearctic
- Savignia fronticornis (Simon, 1884) — Mediterranean
- Savignia harmsi Wunderlich, 1980 — Spain
- Savignia kartalensis Jocque, 1985 — Comoro Islands
- Savignia kawachiensis Oi, 1960 — Japan
- Savignia naniplopi Bosselaers & Henderickx, 2002 — Crete
- Savignia producta Holm, 1977 — Palearctic
- Savignia pseudofrontata Paik, 1978 — Korea
- Savignia rostellatra Song & Li, 2009 — China
- Savignia saitoi Eskov, 1988 — Russia
- Savignia superstes Thaler, 1984 — France
- Savignia ussurica Eskov, 1988 — Russia
- Savignia yasudai (Saito, 1986) — Japan
- Savignia zero Eskov, 1988 — Russia

== Savigniorrhipis ==
Savigniorrhipis Wunderlich, 1992

- Savigniorrhipis acoreensis Wunderlich, 1992 — Azores
- Savigniorrhipis topographicus Crespo, 2013 — Azores

== Scandichrestus ==
Scandichrestus Wunderlich, 1995

- Scandichrestus tenuis (Holm, 1943) — Sweden, Finland, Russia

== Schistogyna ==
Schistogyna Millidge, 1991

- Schistogyna arcana Millidge, 1991 — Juan Fernandez Islands

== Sciastes ==
Sciastes Bishop & Crosby, 1938

- Sciastes carli (Lessert, 1907) — France, Italy, Switzerland, Austria
- Sciastes dubius (Hackman, 1954) — Russia, Canada, USA
- Sciastes extremus Holm, 1967 — Canada, Greenland
- Sciastes hastatus Millidge, 1984 — USA, Canada
- Sciastes mentasta (Chamberlin & Ivie, 1947) — Canada, Alaska
- Sciastes tenna Chamberlin, 1949 — USA
- Sciastes truncatus (Emerton, 1882) — USA, Canada, Alaska

== Scirites ==
Scirites Bishop & Crosby, 1938

- Scirites finitimus Duperre & Paquin, 2007 — USA, Canada
- Scirites pectinatus (Emerton, 1911) — USA, Canada

== Scironis ==
Scironis Bishop & Crosby, 1938

- Scironis sima Chamberlin, 1949 — USA
- Scironis tarsalis (Emerton, 1911) — USA

== Scolecura ==
Scolecura Millidge, 1991

- Scolecura cambara Rodrigues, 2005 — Brazil
- Scolecura cognata Millidge, 1991 — Colombia
- Scolecura parilis Millidge, 1991 — Brazil, Argentina
- Scolecura propinqua Millidge, 1991 — Argentina

== Scolopembolus ==
Scolopembolus Bishop & Crosby, 1938

- Scolopembolus littoralis (Emerton, 1913) — USA

== Scotargus ==
Scotargus Simon, 1913

- Scotargus enghoffi Wunderlich, 1992 — Canary Islands
- Scotargus grancanariensis Wunderlich, 1992 — Canary Islands
- Scotargus numidicus Bosmans, 2006 — Algeria
- Scotargus pilosus Simon, 1913 — Palearctic
- Scotargus secundus Wunderlich, 1987 — Canary Islands
- Scotargus tenerifensis Wunderlich, 1992 — Canary Islands

== Scotinotylus ==
Scotinotylus Simon, 1884

- Scotinotylus alienus (Kulczynski, 1885) — Russia, Alaska, Canada
- Scotinotylus allocotus Crawford & Edwards, 1989 — USA
- Scotinotylus alpigena (L. Koch, 1869) — Palearctic
- Scotinotylus alpinus (Banks, 1896) — Russia, Mongolia, Alaska, Canada, USA, Greenland
- Scotinotylus altaicus Marusik, Hippa & Koponen, 1996 — Russia
- Scotinotylus ambiguus Millidge, 1981 — USA, Canada
- Scotinotylus amurensis Eskov & Marusik, 1994 — Russia
- Scotinotylus antennatus (O. P.-Cambridge, 1875) — Europe. Russia, Kazakhstan
- Scotinotylus apache (Chamberlin, 1949) — USA
- Scotinotylus autor (Chamberlin, 1949) — USA
- Scotinotylus bicavatus Millidge, 1981 — USA
- Scotinotylus bodenburgi (Chamberlin & Ivie, 1947) — Alaska
- Scotinotylus boreus Millidge, 1981 — Canada
- Scotinotylus castoris (Chamberlin, 1949) — USA
- Scotinotylus clavatus (Schenkel, 1927) — Switzerland, Austria
- Scotinotylus columbia (Chamberlin, 1949) — Canada
- Scotinotylus crinitis Millidge, 1981 — USA
- Scotinotylus dubiosus Millidge, 1981 — USA
- Scotinotylus eutypus (Chamberlin, 1949) — Holarctic
- Scotinotylus evansi (O. P.-Cambridge, 1894) — Greenland, Palearctic
- Scotinotylus exsectoides Millidge, 1981 — Canada
- Scotinotylus formicarius (Dondale & Redner, 1972) — USA
- Scotinotylus gracilis Millidge, 1981 — USA
- Scotinotylus humilis Millidge, 1981 — USA
- Scotinotylus kenus (Chamberlin, 1949) — USA
- Scotinotylus kimjoopili Eskov & Marusik, 1994 — Russia
- Scotinotylus kolymensis Eskov & Marusik, 1994 — Russia
- Scotinotylus levii Marusik, 1988 — Russia
- Scotinotylus majesticus (Chamberlin & Ivie, 1947) — Alaska, Canada, USA
- Scotinotylus millidgei Eskov, 1989 — Russia
- Scotinotylus montanus Millidge, 1981 — USA
- Scotinotylus pallidus (Emerton, 1882) — USA, Canada
- Scotinotylus patellatus (Emerton, 1917) — Alaska, Canada, USA
- Scotinotylus pollucis Millidge, 1981 — USA
- Scotinotylus protervus (L. Koch, 1879) — Russia, Kazakhstan, Mongolia, Alaska, Canada
- Scotinotylus provincialis Denis, 1949 — France
- Scotinotylus provo (Chamberlin, 1949) — USA
- Scotinotylus regalis Millidge, 1981 — USA
- Scotinotylus sacer (Crosby, 1929) — Holarctic
- Scotinotylus sacratus Millidge, 1981 — USA
- Scotinotylus sagittatus Millidge, 1981 — USA
- Scotinotylus sanctus (Crosby, 1929) — USA, Canada
- Scotinotylus sintalutus Millidge, 1981 — Canada
- Scotinotylus tianschanicus Tanasevitch, 1989 — Central Asia
- Scotinotylus venetus (Thorell, 1875) — Italy
- Scotinotylus vernalis (Emerton, 1882) — USA, Canada
- Scotinotylus vettonicus Barrientos & Hernández-Corral, 2020 — Spain, France

== Scutpelecopsis ==
Scutpelecopsis Marusik & Gnelitsa, 2009

- Scutpelecopsis krausi (Wunderlich, 1980) — Balkans, Greece to Armenia
- Scutpelecopsis loricata Duma & Tanasevitch, 2011 — Romania
- Scutpelecopsis media Wunderlich, 2011 — Turkey
- Scutpelecopsis procer Wunderlich, 2011 — Iran
- Scutpelecopsis wunderlichi Marusik & Gnelitsa, 2009 — Abkhazia

== Scylaceus ==
Scylaceus Bishop & Crosby, 1938

- Scylaceus pallidus (Emerton, 1882) — USA, Canada
- Scylaceus selma (Chamberlin, 1949) — USA

== Scyletria ==
Scyletria Bishop & Crosby, 1938

- Scyletria inflata Bishop & Crosby, 1938 — USA, Canada

== Selenyphantes ==
Selenyphantes Gertsch & Davis, 1946

- Selenyphantes longispinosus (O. P.-Cambridge, 1896) — Mexico, Guatemala

== Semljicola ==
Semljicola Strand, 1906

- Semljicola alticola (Holm, 1950) — Sweden, Finland, Russia
- Semljicola angulatus (Holm, 1963) — Scandinavia, Russia, Mongolia, Sakhalin
- Semljicola arcticus (Eskov, 1989) — Russia
- Semljicola barbiger (L. Koch, 1879) — Sweden, Finland, Russia, Kazakhstan
- Semljicola beringianus (Eskov, 1989) — Russia
- Semljicola caliginosus (Falconer, 1910) — England, Scotland, Russia
- Semljicola convexus (Holm, 1963) — Russia, Alaska, Canada
- Semljicola faustus (O. P.-Cambridge, 1900) — Palearctic
- Semljicola lapponicus (Holm, 1939) — Scandinavia, Russia, Alaska
- Semljicola latus (Holm, 1939) — Scandinavia, Russia, Mongolia
- Semljicola obtusus (Emerton, 1915) — USA, Canada, Greenland
- Semljicola qixiensis (Gao, Zhu & Fei, 1993) — China
- Semljicola simplex (Kulczynski, 1908) — Russia
- Semljicola thaleri (Eskov, 1981) — Russia, Kazakhstan

== Sengletus ==
Sengletus Tanasevitch, 2008

- Sengletus extricatus (O. P.-Cambridge, 1876) — Egypt, Israel, Iran
- Sengletus latus Tanasevitch, 2009 — Iran

== Shaanxinus ==
Shaanxinus Tanasevitch, 2006

- Shaanxinus anguilliformis (Xia et al., 2001) — China
- Shaanxinus atayal (Lin, 2019) — Taiwan
- Shaanxinus curviductus (Lin, 2019) — Taiwan
- Shaanxinus hehuanensis (Lin, 2019) — Taiwan
- Shaanxinus hirticephalus (Lin, 2019) — Taiwan
- Shaanxinus lixiangae (Lin, 2019) — Taiwan
- Shaanxinus magnaclypeus (Lin, 2019) — Taiwan
- Shaanxinus makauyensis (Lin, 2019) — Taiwan
- Shaanxinus meifengensis (Lin, 2019) — Taiwan
- Shaanxinus mingchihensis (Lin, 2019) — Taiwan
- Shaanxinus rufus Tanasevitch, 2006 — China
- Shaanxinus seediq (Lin, 2019) — Taiwan
- Shaanxinus shihchoensis (Lin, 2019) — Taiwan
- Shaanxinus shoukaensis (Lin, 2019) — Taiwan
- Shaanxinus tamdaoensis (Lin, 2019) — Vietnam
- Shaanxinus tsou (Lin, 2019) — Taiwan

== Shanus ==
Shanus Tanasevitch, 2006

- Shanus taibaiensis Tanasevitch, 2006 — China

== Sibirocyba ==
Sibirocyba Eskov & Marusik, 1994

- Sibirocyba incerta (Kulczynski, 1916) — Russia

== Silometopoides ==
Silometopoides Eskov, 1990

- Silometopoides asiaticus (Eskov, 1995) – Kazakhstan
- Silometopoides koponeni (Eskov & Marusik, 1994) – Russia
- Silometopoides mongolensis Eskov & Marusik, 1992 – Russia, Mongolia
- Silometopoides pampia (Chamberlin, 1949)^{T} – Russia, Canada, Greenland
- Silometopoides pingrensis (Crosby & Bishop, 1933) – USA
- Silometopoides sibiricus (Eskov, 1989) – Russia
- Silometopoides sphagnicola Eskov & Marusik, 1992 – Russia
- Silometopoides tibialis (Heimer, 1987) – Russia, Mongolia
- Silometopoides yodoensis (Oi, 1960) – Russia, China, Korea, Japan

== Silometopus ==
Silometopus Simon, 1926

- Silometopus acutus Holm, 1977 — Sweden, Poland, Russia
- Silometopus ambiguus (O. P.-Cambridge, 1905) — Europe
- Silometopus bonessi Casemir, 1970 — Belgium, Switzerland, Austria, Germany, Slovakia
- Silometopus braunianus Thaler, 1978 — Switzerland, Italy
- Silometopus crassipedis Tanasevitch & Piterkina, 2007 — Russia, Kazakhstan
- Silometopus curtus (Simon, 1881) — Europe
- Silometopus elegans (O. P.-Cambridge, 1872) — Palearctic
- Silometopus incurvatus (O. P.-Cambridge, 1873) — Palearctic
- Silometopus minutus (Tanasevitch, 2016) — Israel
- Silometopus nitidithorax (Simon, 1914) — France, Greece
- Silometopus pectinatus (Tanasevitch, 2016) — Israel
- Silometopus reussi (Thorell, 1871) — Palearctic
- Silometopus rosemariae Wunderlich, 1969 — Germany, Switzerland, Austria, Italy
- Silometopus sachalinensis (Eskov & Marusik, 1994) — Russia, Japan
- Silometopus tenuispinus Denis, 1949 — France, Andorra
- Silometopus uralensis Tanasevitch, 1985 — Russia

== Simplicistilus ==
Simplicistilus Locket, 1968

- Simplicistilus tanuekes Locket, 1968 — West, Central Africa

== Singatrichona ==
Singatrichona Tanasevitch, 2019

- Singatrichona longipes Tanasevitch, 2019 — Singapore

== Sinolinyphia ==
Sinolinyphia Wunderlich & Li, 1995

- Sinolinyphia henanensis (Hu, Wang & Wang, 1991) — China

== Sintula ==
Sintula Simon, 1884

- Sintula corniger (Blackwall, 1856) — Europe to Azerbaijan
- Sintula cretaensis Wunderlich, 1995 — Crete
- Sintula criodes (Thorell, 1875) — Ukraine
- Sintula cristatus Wunderlich, 1995 — Turkey
- Sintula diceros Simon, 1926 — France
- Sintula furcifer (Simon, 1911) — Portugal, Spain, Morocco, Algeria
- Sintula iberica Bosmans, 2010 — Portugal
- Sintula orientalis Bosmans, 1991 — Algeria
- Sintula oseticus Tanasevitch, 1990 — Russia
- Sintula pecten Wunderlich, 2011 — Canary Islands
- Sintula penicilliger (Simon, 1884) — Algeria
- Sintula pseudocorniger Bosmans, 1991 — Algeria, Tunisia
- Sintula retroversus (O. P.-Cambridge, 1875) — Europe to Azerbaijan
- Sintula roeweri Kratochvil, 1935 — Montenegro
- Sintula solitarius Gnelitsa, 2012 — Ukraine
- Sintula spiniger (Balogh, 1935) — Austria to Russia, Ukraine
- Sintula subterminalis Bosmans, 1991 — Algeria

== Sisicottus ==
Sisicottus Bishop & Crosby, 1938

- Sisicottus aenigmaticus Miller, 1999 — USA
- Sisicottus crossoclavis Miller, 1999 — USA, Canada
- Sisicottus cynthiae Miller, 1999 — USA
- Sisicottus montanus (Emerton, 1882) — USA, Canada
- Sisicottus montigenus Bishop & Crosby, 1938 — USA
- Sisicottus nesides (Chamberlin, 1921) — USA, Canada, Alaska
- Sisicottus orites (Chamberlin, 1919) — USA, Canada
- Sisicottus panopeus Miller, 1999 — USA, Canada, Kurile Islands
- Sisicottus quoylei Miller, 1999 — USA, Canada

== Sisicus ==
Sisicus Bishop & Crosby, 1938

- Sisicus apertus (Holm, 1939) — Holarctic
- Sisicus penifusifer Bishop & Crosby, 1938 — USA, Canada
- Sisicus volutasilex Duperre & Paquin, 2007 — Canada

== Sisis ==
Sisis Bishop & Crosby, 1938

- Sisis plesius (Chamberlin, 1949) — USA
- Sisis rotundus (Emerton, 1925) — USA, Canada

== Sisyrbe ==
Sisyrbe Bishop & Crosby, 1938

- Sisyrbe rustica (Banks, 1892) — USA

== Sitalcas ==
Sitalcas Bishop & Crosby, 1938

- Sitalcas ruralis Bishop & Crosby, 1938 — USA

== Smerasia ==
Smerasia Zhao & Li, 2014

- Smerasia obscurus Zhao & Li, 2014 — China

== Smermisia ==
Smermisia Simon, 1894

- Smermisia caracasana Simon, 1894 — Venezuela
- Smermisia esperanzae (Tullgren, 1901) — Chile
- Smermisia holdridgi Miller, 2007 — Costa Rica
- Smermisia parvoris Miller, 2007 — Brazil, Argentina
- Smermisia vicosana (Bishop & Crosby, 1938) — Brazil, Argentina

== Smodix ==
Smodix Bishop & Crosby, 1938

- Smodix reticulata (Emerton, 1915) — USA, Canada

== Solenysa ==
Solenysa Simon, 1894

- Solenysa geumoensis Seo, 1996 — Korea
- Solenysa lanyuensis Tu, 2011 — Taiwan
- Solenysa longqiensis Li & Song, 1992 — China, Taiwan
- Solenysa macrodonta Wang, Ono & Tu, 2015 — Japan
- Solenysa mellotteei Simon, 1894 — Japan
- Solenysa ogatai Ono, 2011 — Japan
- Solenysa partibilis Tu, Ono & Li, 2007 — Japan
- Solenysa protrudens Gao, Zhu & Sha, 1993 — China
- Solenysa reflexilis Tu, Ono & Li, 2007 — Japan
- Solenysa retractilis Tu, 2011 — China
- Solenysa spiralis Tian & Tu, 2018 — China
- Solenysa tianmushana Tu, 2011 — China
- Solenysa trunciformis Wang, Ono & Tu, 2015 — Japan
- Solenysa wulingensis Li & Song, 1992 — China
- Solenysa yangmingshana Tu, 2011 — Taiwan

== Soucron ==
Soucron Crosby & Bishop, 1936

- Soucron arenarium (Emerton, 1925) — USA, Canada

== Souessa ==
Souessa Crosby & Bishop, 1936

- Souessa spinifera (O. P.-Cambridge, 1874) — USA

== Souessoula ==
Souessoula Crosby & Bishop, 1936

- Souessoula parva (Banks, 1899) — USA

== Sougambus ==
Sougambus Crosby & Bishop, 1936

- Sougambus bostoniensis (Emerton, 1882) — USA, Canada

== Souidas ==
Souidas Crosby & Bishop, 1936

- Souidas tibialis (Emerton, 1882) — USA

== Soulgas ==
Soulgas Crosby & Bishop, 1936

- Soulgas corticarius (Emerton, 1909) — USA

== Spanioplanus ==
Spanioplanus Millidge, 1991

- Spanioplanus mitis Millidge, 1991 — Venezuela, Peru

== Sphecozone ==
Sphecozone O. P.-Cambridge, 1870

- Sphecozone altehabitans (Keyserling, 1886) — Peru
- Sphecozone alticeps Millidge, 1991 — Colombia
- Sphecozone araeonciformis (Simon, 1895) — Argentina
- Sphecozone bicolor (Nicolet, 1849) — Chile, Argentina
- Sphecozone capitata Millidge, 1991 — Peru
- Sphecozone castanea (Millidge, 1991) — Brazil
- Sphecozone corniculans Millidge, 1991 — Colombia
- Sphecozone cornuta Millidge, 1991 — Argentina
- Sphecozone crassa (Millidge, 1991) — Colombia, Brazil
- Sphecozone crinita Millidge, 1991 — Ecuador
- Sphecozone diversicolor (Keyserling, 1886) — Brazil, Argentina
- Sphecozone fastibilis (Keyserling, 1886) — Brazil, Argentina
- Sphecozone formosa (Millidge, 1991) — Ecuador
- Sphecozone gravis (Millidge, 1991) — Bolivia
- Sphecozone ignigena (Keyserling, 1886) — Brazil, Argentina
- Sphecozone labiata (Keyserling, 1886) — Brazil
- Sphecozone lobata Millidge, 1991 — Juan Fernandez Islands
- Sphecozone longipes (Strand, 1908) — Peru
- Sphecozone magnipalpis Millidge, 1993 — USA
- Sphecozone melanocephala (Millidge, 1991) — Brazil
- Sphecozone modesta (Nicolet, 1849) — Bolivia, Brazil, Chile, Argentina
- Sphecozone modica Millidge, 1991 — Argentina
- Sphecozone nigripes Millidge, 1991 — Peru
- Sphecozone nitens Millidge, 1991 — Ecuador, Peru
- Sphecozone niwina (Chamberlin, 1916) — Peru, Bolivia, Chile
- Sphecozone novaeteutoniae (Baert, 1987) — Brazil
- Sphecozone personata (Simon, 1894) — Brazil
- Sphecozone rostrata Millidge, 1991 — Brazil
- Sphecozone rubescens O. P.-Cambridge, 1870 — Brazil, Paraguay, Argentina
- Sphecozone rubicunda (Keyserling, 1886) — Peru
- Sphecozone spadicaria (Simon, 1894) — Colombia, Trinidad, Venezuela
- Sphecozone tumidosa (Keyserling, 1886) — Brazil, Argentina
- Sphecozone varia Millidge, 1991 — Peru
- Sphecozone venialis (Keyserling, 1886) — Brazil, Argentina

== Spiralophantes ==
Spiralophantes Tanasevitch & Saaristo, 2006

- Spiralophantes mirabilis Tanasevitch & Saaristo, 2006 — Nepal

== Spirembolus ==
Spirembolus Chamberlin, 1920

- Spirembolus abnormis Millidge, 1980 — USA, Canada
- Spirembolus approximatus (Chamberlin, 1949) — USA
- Spirembolus bilobatus (Chamberlin & Ivie, 1945) — USA
- Spirembolus cheronus Chamberlin, 1949 — USA
- Spirembolus chilkatensis (Chamberlin & Ivie, 1947) — USA, Alaska
- Spirembolus demonologicus (Crosby, 1925) — USA
- Spirembolus dispar Millidge, 1980 — USA
- Spirembolus elevatus Millidge, 1980 — USA
- Spirembolus erratus Millidge, 1980 — USA
- Spirembolus falcatus Millidge, 1980 — USA
- Spirembolus fasciatus (Banks, 1904) — USA
- Spirembolus fuscus Millidge, 1980 — USA
- Spirembolus hibernus Millidge, 1980 — USA
- Spirembolus humilis Millidge, 1980 — USA
- Spirembolus latebricola Millidge, 1980 — USA
- Spirembolus levis Millidge, 1980 — USA, Mexico
- Spirembolus maderus Chamberlin, 1949 — USA
- Spirembolus mendax Millidge, 1980 — USA
- Spirembolus mirus Millidge, 1980 — USA
- Spirembolus monicus (Chamberlin, 1949) — USA
- Spirembolus monticolens (Chamberlin, 1919) — USA, Canada
- Spirembolus montivagus Millidge, 1980 — USA
- Spirembolus mundus Chamberlin & Ivie, 1933 — USA, Canada
- Spirembolus novellus Millidge, 1980 — USA
- Spirembolus oreinoides Chamberlin, 1949 — USA, Canada
- Spirembolus pachygnathus Chamberlin & Ivie, 1935 — USA
- Spirembolus pallidus Chamberlin & Ivie, 1935 — USA
- Spirembolus perjucundus Crosby, 1925 — USA
- Spirembolus phylax Chamberlin & Ivie, 1935 — USA
- Spirembolus praelongus Millidge, 1980 — USA
- Spirembolus prominens Millidge, 1980 — USA, Canada
- Spirembolus proximus Millidge, 1980 — USA
- Spirembolus pusillus Millidge, 1980 — USA
- Spirembolus redondo (Chamberlin & Ivie, 1945) — USA
- Spirembolus spirotubus (Banks, 1895) — USA, Canada
- Spirembolus synopticus Crosby, 1925 — USA
- Spirembolus tiogensis Millidge, 1980 — USA
- Spirembolus tortuosus (Crosby, 1925) — USA
- Spirembolus vallicolens Chamberlin, 1920 — USA
- Spirembolus venustus Millidge, 1980 — USA
- Spirembolus whitneyanus Chamberlin & Ivie, 1935 — USA

== Stemonyphantes ==
Stemonyphantes Menge, 1866

- Stemonyphantes abantensis Wunderlich, 1978 — Turkey
- Stemonyphantes agnatus Tanasevitch, 1990 — Russia, Georgia, Azerbaijan
- Stemonyphantes altaicus Tanasevitch, 2000 — Russia, Kazakhstan
- Stemonyphantes blauveltae Gertsch, 1951 — USA, Canada
- Stemonyphantes conspersus (L. Koch, 1879) — Central Europe to Kazakhstan
- Stemonyphantes curvipes Tanasevitch, 1989 — Kyrgyzstan
- Stemonyphantes griseus (Schenkel, 1936) — Kyrgyzstan, China
- Stemonyphantes grossus Tanasevitch, 1985 — Kyrgyzstan
- Stemonyphantes karatau Tanasevitch & Esyunin, 2012 — Kazakhstan
- Stemonyphantes lineatus (Linnaeus, 1758) — Palearctic
- Stemonyphantes menyuanensis Hu, 2001 — China
- Stemonyphantes montanus Wunderlich, 1978 — Turkey
- Stemonyphantes parvipalpus Tanasevitch, 2007 — Russia
- Stemonyphantes serratus Tanasevitch, 2011 — Turkey
- Stemonyphantes sibiricus (Grube, 1861) — Russia, Kazakhstan, Mongolia, Kurile Islands
- Stemonyphantes solitudus Tanasevitch, 1994 — Turkmenistan
- Stemonyphantes taiganoides Tanasevitch, Esyunin & Stepina, 2012 — Russia, Kazakhstan
- Stemonyphantes taiganus (Ermolajev, 1930) — Russia

== Sthelota ==
Sthelota Simon, 1894

- Sthelota albonotata (Keyserling, 1886) — Panama
- Sthelota sana (O. P.-Cambridge, 1898) — Guatemala

== Stictonanus ==
Stictonanus Millidge, 1991

- Stictonanus exiguus Millidge, 1991 — Chile
- Stictonanus paucus Millidge, 1991 — Chile

== Strandella ==
Strandella Oi, 1960

- Strandella fluctimaculata Saito, 1982 — Russia, Japan
- Strandella paranglampara Barrion, Barrion-Dupo & Heong, 2013 — China
- Strandella pargongensis (Paik, 1965) — Russia, China, Korea, Japan
- Strandella quadrimaculata (Uyemura, 1937) — Japan
- Strandella yaginumai Saito, 1982 — Japan

== Strongyliceps ==
Strongyliceps Fage, in Fage & Simon, 1936

- Strongyliceps alluaudi Fage, 1936 — Kenya
- Strongyliceps anderseni Holm, 1962 — Kenya, Uganda

== Styloctetor ==
Styloctetor Simon, 1884

- Styloctetor austerus (L. Koch, 1884) — Switzerland, Austria
- Styloctetor compar (Breitling et al., 2015) — Alaska, Canada, Europe, Russia, Kazakhstan
- Styloctetor lehtineni Marusik & Tanasevitch, 1998 — Russia
- Styloctetor logunovi (Eskov & Marusik, 1994) — Russia, Kazakhstan, Mongolia
- Styloctetor okhotensis (Eskov, 1993) — Russia
- Styloctetor purpurescens (Keyserling, 1886) — USA, Canada
- Styloctetor romanus (O. P.-Cambridge, 1872) — Palearctic
- Styloctetor tuvinensis Marusik & Tanasevitch, 1998 — Russia

== Subbekasha ==
Subbekasha Millidge, 1984

- Subbekasha flabellifera Millidge, 1984 — Canada

== Syedra ==
Syedra Simon, 1884

- Syedra apetlonensis Wunderlich, 1992 — Austria, Slovakia, Russia
- Syedra gracilis (Menge, 1869) — Palearctic
- Syedra myrmicarum (Kulczynski, 1882) — Central Europe
- Syedra nigrotibialis Simon, 1884 — Corsica
- Syedra oii Saito, 1983 — China, Korea, Japan
- Syedra parvula Kritscher, 1996 — Malta
- Syedra scamba (Locket, 1968) — Congo

== Symmigma ==
Symmigma Crosby & Bishop, 1933

- Symmigma minimum (Emerton, 1923) — USA

== Tachygyna ==
Tachygyna Chamberlin & Ivie, 1939

- Tachygyna alia Millidge, 1984 — USA
- Tachygyna cognata Millidge, 1984 — USA
- Tachygyna coosi Millidge, 1984 — USA
- Tachygyna delecta Chamberlin & Ivie, 1939 — USA
- Tachygyna exilis Millidge, 1984 — USA, Canada
- Tachygyna gargopa (Crosby & Bishop, 1929) — USA
- Tachygyna haydeni Chamberlin & Ivie, 1939 — USA, Canada
- Tachygyna pallida Chamberlin & Ivie, 1939 — USA, Canada
- Tachygyna proba Millidge, 1984 — USA, Canada
- Tachygyna sonoma Millidge, 1984 — USA
- Tachygyna speciosa Millidge, 1984 — USA
- Tachygyna tuoba (Chamberlin & Ivie, 1933) — USA
- Tachygyna ursina (Bishop & Crosby, 1938) — USA, Canada, Alaska
- Tachygyna vancouverana Chamberlin & Ivie, 1939 — USA, Canada
- Tachygyna watona Chamberlin, 1949 — USA

== Taibainus ==
Taibainus Tanasevitch, 2006

- Taibainus shanensis Tanasevitch, 2006 — China

== Taibaishanus ==
Taibaishanus Tanasevitch, 2006

- Taibaishanus elegans Tanasevitch, 2006 — China

== Tallusia ==
Tallusia Lehtinen & Saaristo, 1972

- Tallusia bicristata Lehtinen & Saaristo, 1972 — Turkey
- Tallusia experta (O. P.-Cambridge, 1871) — Palearctic
- Tallusia forficala (Zhu & Tu, 1986) — China
- Tallusia pindos Thaler, 1997 — Greece
- Tallusia vindobonensis (Kulczynski, 1898) — Central, Eastern Europe

== Tanasevitchia ==
Tanasevitchia Marusik & Saaristo, 1999

- Tanasevitchia strandi (Ermolajev, 1937) — Russia
- Tanasevitchia uralensis (Tanasevitch, 1983) — Russia

== Tapinocyba ==
Tapinocyba Simon, 1884

- Tapinocyba abetoneensis Wunderlich, 1980 — Italy
- Tapinocyba affinis Lessert, 1907 — Palearctic
  - Tapinocyba affinis orientalis Millidge, 1979 — Central Europe
  - Tapinocyba affinis pyrenaea Millidge, 1979 — France
- Tapinocyba algirica Bosmans, 2007 — Portugal, Algeria
- Tapinocyba altimontana Tanasevitch, 2019 — Nepal
- Tapinocyba anceps Denis, 1948 — France
- Tapinocyba bicarinata (Emerton, 1913) — USA
- Tapinocyba biscissa (O. P.-Cambridge, 1872) — Palearctic
- Tapinocyba cameroni Duperre & Paquin, 2007 — Canada
- Tapinocyba corsica (Simon, 1884) — Corsica
- Tapinocyba dietrichi Crosby & Bishop, 1933 — USA
- Tapinocyba discedens Denis, 1948 — France
- Tapinocyba distincta (Banks, 1892) — USA
- Tapinocyba emei Tanasevitch, 2018 — China
- Tapinocyba emertoni Barrows & Ivie, 1942 — USA
- Tapinocyba formosa Tanasevitch, 2011 — Taiwan
- Tapinocyba gamma Chamberlin, 1949 — USA
- Tapinocyba hortensis (Emerton, 1924) — USA
- Tapinocyba insecta (L. Koch, 1869) — Palearctic
- Tapinocyba kolymensis Eskov, 1989 — Russia, China
- Tapinocyba latia Millidge, 1979 — Italy
- Tapinocyba ligurica Thaler, 1976 — Italy, France
- Tapinocyba lindrothi Hackman, 1954 — Canada
- Tapinocyba lucana Millidge, 1979 — Italy
- Tapinocyba maureri Thaler, 1991 — Switzerland, Italy
- Tapinocyba minuta (Emerton, 1909) — USA, Canada
- Tapinocyba mitis (O. P.-Cambridge, 1882) — Britain, Spain, France, Latvia
- Tapinocyba montivaga Tanasevitch, 2019 — Nepal
- Tapinocyba pallens (O. P.-Cambridge, 1872) — Europe to Armenia
- Tapinocyba pontis Chamberlin, 1949 — USA
- Tapinocyba praecox (O. P.-Cambridge, 1873) — Europe
- Tapinocyba prima Duperre & Paquin, 2005 — USA, Canada
- Tapinocyba silvicultrix Saito, 1980 — Japan
- Tapinocyba simplex (Emerton, 1882) — USA
- Tapinocyba spoliatrix Tanasevitch, 1985 — Kyrgyzstan
- Tapinocyba sucra Chamberlin, 1949 — USA
- Tapinocyba suganamii Saito & Ono, 2001 — Japan
- Tapinocyba ventosa Millidge, 1979 — France
- Tapinocyba vermontis Chamberlin, 1949 — USA

== Tapinocyboides ==
Tapinocyboides Wiehle, 1960

- Tapinocyboides bengalensis Tanasevitch, 2011 — India
- Tapinocyboides pygmaeus (Menge, 1869) — Palearctic

== Tapinopa ==
Tapinopa Westring, 1851

- Tapinopa bilineata Banks, 1893 — USA
- Tapinopa disjugata Simon, 1884 — Palearctic
- Tapinopa gerede Saaristo, 1997 — Turkey
- Tapinopa guttata Komatsu, 1937 — Russia, China, Japan
- Tapinopa hentzi Gertsch, 1951 — USA
- Tapinopa longidens (Wider, 1834) — Palearctic
- Tapinopa undata Zhao & Li, 2014 — China
- Tapinopa vara Locket, 1982 — Malaysia

== Tapinotorquis ==
Tapinotorquis Duperre & Paquin, 2007

- Tapinotorquis yamaskensis Duperre & Paquin, 2007 — USA, Canada

== Taranucnus ==
Taranucnus Simon, 1884

- Taranucnus beskidicus Hirna, 2018 — Ukraine
- Taranucnus bihari Fage, 1931 — Eastern Europe
- Taranucnus carpaticus Gnelitsa, 2016 — Ukraine
- Taranucnus nishikii Yaginuma, 1972 — Japan
- Taranucnus ornithes (Barrows, 1940) — USA
- Taranucnus setosus (O. P.-Cambridge, 1863) — Palearctic

== Tarsiphantes ==
Tarsiphantes Strand, 1905

- Tarsiphantes latithorax Strand, 1905 — Russia, Canada, Greenland

== Tchatkalophantes ==
Tchatkalophantes Tanasevitch, 2001

- Tchatkalophantes baltistan Tanasevitch, 2011 — Pakistan
- Tchatkalophantes bonneti (Schenkel, 1963) — China
- Tchatkalophantes huangyuanensis (Zhu & Li, 1983) — China
- Tchatkalophantes hyperauritus (Loksa, 1965) — Mongolia
- Tchatkalophantes karatau Tanasevitch, 2001 — Kazakhstan
- Tchatkalophantes kungei Tanasevitch, 2001 — Kyrgyzstan
- Tchatkalophantes mongolicus Tanasevitch, 2001 — Mongolia
- Tchatkalophantes rupeus (Tanasevitch, 1986) — Kazakhstan
- Tchatkalophantes tarabaevi Tanasevitch, 2001 — Kazakhstan
- Tchatkalophantes tchatkalensis (Tanasevitch, 1983) — Central Asia

== Tegulinus ==
Tegulinus Tanasevitch, 2017

- Tegulinus bifurcatus Tanasevitch, 2017 — Sumatra
- Tegulinus sumatranus Tanasevitch, 2017 — Sumatra

== Tennesseellum ==
Tennesseellum Petrunkevitch, 1925

- Tennesseellum formica (Emerton, 1882) — North America, Marshall Islands
- Tennesseellum gollum Duperre, 2013 — USA

== Tenuiphantes ==
Tenuiphantes Saaristo & Tanasevitch, 1996

- Tenuiphantes aduncus (Zhu, Li & Sha, 1986) — China
- Tenuiphantes aequalis (Tanasevitch, 1987) — Turkey, Russia, Armenia
- Tenuiphantes alacris (Blackwall, 1853) — Palearctic
- Tenuiphantes altimontanus Tanasevitch & Saaristo, 2006 — Nepal
- Tenuiphantes ancatus (Li & Zhu, 1989) — China
- Tenuiphantes ateripes (Tanasevitch, 1988) — Russia
- Tenuiphantes canariensis (Wunderlich, 1987) — Canary Islands
- Tenuiphantes cantabropyrenaeus Bosmans, 2016 — Spain, France
- Tenuiphantes contortus (Tanasevitch, 1986) — Russia, Georgia, Azerbaijan, Armenia
- Tenuiphantes cracens (Zorsch, 1937) — North America
- Tenuiphantes crassus Tanasevitch & Saaristo, 2006 — Nepal
- Tenuiphantes cristatus (Menge, 1866) — Palearctic
- Tenuiphantes drenskyi (van Helsdingen, 1977) — Bulgaria
- Tenuiphantes flavipes (Blackwall, 1854) — Palearctic
- Tenuiphantes floriana (van Helsdingen, 1977) — Romania
- Tenuiphantes fogarasensis (Weiss, 1986) — Romania
- Tenuiphantes fulvus (Wunderlich, 1987) — Canary Islands
- Tenuiphantes herbicola (Simon, 1884) — France, Corsica, Italy, Algeria
- Tenuiphantes jacksoni (Schenkel, 1925) — Switzerland, Austria, Turkey
- Tenuiphantes jacksonoides (van Helsdingen, 1977) — Switzerland, Germany, Austria
- Tenuiphantes lagonaki Tanasevitch, Ponomarev & Chumachenko, 2016 — Russia (Caucasus)
- Tenuiphantes leprosoides (Schmidt, 1975) — Canary Islands
- Tenuiphantes mengei (Kulczynski, 1887) — Palearctic
- Tenuiphantes miguelensis (Wunderlich, 1992) — Azores, Madeira
- Tenuiphantes monachus (Simon, 1884) — Europe
- Tenuiphantes morosus (Tanasevitch, 1987) — Russia, Georgia, Azerbaijan
- Tenuiphantes nigriventris (L. Koch, 1879) — Holarctic
- Tenuiphantes perseus (van Helsdingen, 1977) — Russia, Central Asia, Iran
- Tenuiphantes plumipes (Tanasevitch, 1987) — Nepal
- Tenuiphantes retezaticus (Ruzicka, 1985) — Romania
- Tenuiphantes sabulosus (Keyserling, 1886) — North America
- Tenuiphantes spiniger (Simon, 1929) — France
- Tenuiphantes stramencola (Scharff, 1990) — Tanzania
- Tenuiphantes striatiscapus (Wunderlich, 1987) — Canary Islands
- Tenuiphantes suborientalis Tanasevitch, 2000 — Russia
- Tenuiphantes teberdaensis Tanasevitch, 2010 — Russia
- Tenuiphantes tenebricola (Wider, 1834) — Palearctic
- Tenuiphantes tenebricoloides (Schenkel, 1938) — Madeira
- Tenuiphantes tenuis (Blackwall, 1852) — Palearctic (elsewhere, introduced)
- Tenuiphantes wunderlichi (Saaristo & Tanasevitch, 1996) — Turkey
- Tenuiphantes zebra (Emerton, 1882) — North America
- Tenuiphantes zelatus (Zorsch, 1937) — North America
- Tenuiphantes zibus (Zorsch, 1937) — North America
- Tenuiphantes zimmermanni (Bertkau, 1890) — Europe, Russia

== Ternatus ==
Ternatus Sun, Li & Tu, 2012

- Ternatus malleatus Sun, Li & Tu, 2012 — China
- Ternatus siculus Sun, Li & Tu, 2012 — China

== Tessamoro ==
Tessamoro Eskov, 1993

- Tessamoro pallidus Eskov, 1993 — Russia

== Thainetes ==
Thainetes Millidge, 1995

- Thainetes tristis Millidge, 1995 — Thailand

== Thaiphantes ==
Thaiphantes Millidge, 1995

- Thaiphantes milneri Millidge, 1995 — Thailand
- Thaiphantes similis Millidge, 1995 — Thailand

== Thaleria ==
Thaleria Tanasevitch, 1984

- Thaleria alnetorum Eskov & Marusik, 1992 — Russia
- Thaleria evenkiensis Eskov & Marusik, 1992 — Russia
- Thaleria leechi Eskov & Marusik, 1992 — Russia, Alaska
- Thaleria orientalis Tanasevitch, 1984 — Russia
- Thaleria sajanensis Eskov & Marusik, 1992 — Russia
- Thaleria sukatchevae Eskov & Marusik, 1992 — Russia

== Thapsagus ==
Thapsagus Simon, 1894

- Thapsagus pulcher Simon, 1894 — Madagascar

== Thaumatoncus ==
Thaumatoncus Simon, 1884

- Thaumatoncus indicator Simon, 1884 — France, Algeria, Tunisia
- Thaumatoncus secundus Bosmans, 2002 — Algeria

== Theoa ==
Theoa Saaristo, 1995

- Theoa elegans Tanasevitch, 2014 — China, Thailand
- Theoa hamata Tanasevitch, 2014 — Thailand, Laos, Sumatra
- Theoa longicrusa Tanasevitch, 2014 — Thailand
- Theoa malaya Tanasevitch, 2017 — Malaysia (mainland)
- Theoa tricaudata (Locket, 1982) — Seychelles, Malaysia
- Theoa vesica Zhao & Li, 2014 — China

== Theoneta ==
Theoneta Eskov & Marusik, 1991

- Theoneta aterrima (Eskov & Marusik, 1991) — Russia (north-eastern Siberia to Far East)
- Theoneta saaristoi (Eskov & Marusik, 1991) — Russia (north-eastern Siberia, Far East)

== Theonina ==
Theonina Simon, 1929

- Theonina cornix (Simon, 1881) — Europe, North Africa, Russia
- Theonina kratochvili Miller & Weiss, 1979 — Central Europe to Russia
- Theonina laguncula (Denis, 1937) — Morocco, Algeria, Spain, Cyprus
- Theonina linyphioides (Denis, 1937) — Algeria

== Thyreobaeus ==
Thyreobaeus Simon, 1889

- Thyreobaeus scutiger Simon, 1889 — Madagascar

== Thyreosthenius ==
Thyreosthenius Simon, 1884

- Thyreosthenius biovatus (O. P.-Cambridge, 1875) — Palearctic
- Thyreosthenius parasiticus (Westring, 1851) — Holarctic

== Tibiaster ==
Tibiaster Tanasevitch, 1987

- Tibiaster djanybekensis Tanasevitch, 1987 — Kazakhstan
- Tibiaster wunderlichi Eskov, 1995 — Kazakhstan

== Tibioploides ==
Tibioploides Eskov & Marusik, 1991

- Tibioploides arcuatus (Tullgren, 1955) — Scandinavia, Russia, Estonia
- Tibioploides cyclicus Sha & Zhu, 1995 — China
- Tibioploides eskovianus Saito & Ono, 2001 — Japan
- Tibioploides kurenstchikovi Eskov & Marusik, 1991 — Russia
- Tibioploides monticola Saito & Ono, 2001 — Japan
- Tibioploides pacificus Eskov & Marusik, 1991 — Russia
- Tibioploides stigmosus (Xia et al., 2001) — Russia, China

== Tibioplus ==
Tibioplus Chamberlin & Ivie, 1947

- Tibioplus diversus (L. Koch, 1879) — Scandinavia, Russia, Mongolia, Alaska
- Tibioplus tachygynoides Tanasevitch, 1989 — Kyrgyzstan

== Tiso ==
Tiso Simon, 1884

- Tiso aestivus (L. Koch, 1872) — Holarctic
- Tiso biceps Gao, Zhu & Gao, 1993 — China
- Tiso camillus Tanasevitch, 1990 — Azerbaijan
- Tiso golovatchi Tanasevitch, 2006 — Russia
- Tiso incisus Tanasevitch, 2011 — India, Pakistan
- Tiso indianus Tanasevitch, 2011 — India
- Tiso megalops Caporiacco, 1935 — Karakorum
- Tiso vagans (Blackwall, 1834) — Europe, Russia

== Tmeticodes ==
Tmeticodes Ono, 2010

- Tmeticodes gibbifer Ono, 2010 — Japan

== Tmeticus ==
Tmeticus Menge, 1868

- Tmeticus affinis (Blackwall, 1855) — Holarctic
- Tmeticus neserigonoides Saito & Ono, 2001 — Japan
- Tmeticus nigerrimus Saito & Ono, 2001 — Japan
- Tmeticus nigriceps (Kulczynski, 1916) — Russia
- Tmeticus ornatus (Emerton, 1914) — USA, Canada
- Tmeticus tolli Kulczynski, 1908 — Russia, Mongolia, China, Sakhalin
- Tmeticus vulcanicus Saito & Ono, 2001 — Japan

== Tojinium ==
Tojinium Saito & Ono, 2001

- Tojinium japonicum Saito & Ono, 2001 — Japan

== Toltecaria ==
Toltecaria Miller, 2007

- Toltecaria antricola (Millidge, 1984) — Mexico

== Tomohyphantes ==
Tomohyphantes Millidge, 1995

- Tomohyphantes niger Millidge, 1995 — Krakatau
- Tomohyphantes opacus Millidge, 1995 — Krakatau

== Toschia ==
Toschia Caporiacco, 1949

- Toschia aberdarensis Holm, 1962 — Kenya
- Toschia casta Jocque & Scharff, 1986 — Tanzania
- Toschia celans Gao, Xing & Zhu, 1996 — China
- Toschia concolor Caporiacco, 1949 — Kenya
- Toschia cypericola Jocque, 1981 — Malawi
- Toschia minuta Jocque, 1984 — South Africa
- Toschia picta Caporiacco, 1949 — Congo, Kenya
- Toschia spinosa Holm, 1968 — Congo
- Toschia telekii Holm, 1962 — Kenya
- Toschia virgo Jocque & Scharff, 1986 — Tanzania

== Totua ==
Totua Keyserling, 1891

- Totua gracilipes Keyserling, 1891 — Brazil

== Trachyneta ==
Trachyneta Holm, 1968

- Trachyneta extensa Holm, 1968 — Congo
- Trachyneta jocquei Merrett, 2004 — Malawi

== Traematosisis ==
Traematosisis Bishop & Crosby, 1938

- Traematosisis bispinosus (Emerton, 1911) — USA

== Trematocephalus ==
Trematocephalus Dahl, 1886

- Trematocephalus cristatus (Wider, 1834) — Palearctic
- Trematocephalus obscurus Denis, 1950 — France
- Trematocephalus simplex Simon, 1894 — Sri Lanka
- Trematocephalus tripunctatus Simon, 1894 — Sri Lanka

== Trichobactrus ==
Trichobactrus Wunderlich, 1995

- Trichobactrus brevispinosus Wunderlich, 1995 — Mongolia

== Trichoncoides ==
Trichoncoides Denis, 1950

- Trichoncoides pilosus Denis, 1950 — France
- Trichoncoides piscator (Simon, 1884) — Palearctic
- Trichoncoides striganovae Tanasevitch & Piterkina, 2012 — Russia, Kazakhstan

== Trichoncus ==
Trichoncus Simon, 1884

- Trichoncus affinis Kulczynski, 1894 — Palearctic
- Trichoncus ambrosii Wunderlich, 2011 — Switzerland, Italy
- Trichoncus aurantiipes Simon, 1884 — Portugal, Morocco, Algeria, Tunisia
- Trichoncus auritus (L. Koch, 1869) — Europe, Russia
- Trichoncus gibbulus Denis, 1944 — France
- Trichoncus hackmani Millidge, 1955 — Central, Northern Europe
- Trichoncus helveticus Denis, 1965 — Switzerland, France
- Trichoncus hirtus Denis, 1965 — Corsica
- Trichoncus hispidosus Tanasevitch, 1990 — Russia
- Trichoncus hyperboreus Eskov, 1992 — Russia
- Trichoncus kenyensis Thaler, 1974 — Kenya
- Trichoncus lanatus Tanasevitch, 1987 — Georgia
- Trichoncus maculatus Fei, Gao & Zhu, 1997 — China
- Trichoncus monticola Denis, 1965 — Spain
- Trichoncus nairobi Russell-Smith & Jocque, 1986 — Kenya
- Trichoncus orientalis Eskov, 1992 — Russia
- Trichoncus patrizii Caporiacco, 1953 — Italy
- Trichoncus pinguis Simon, 1926 — Spain
- Trichoncus rostralis Tanasevitch, 2013 — Israel
- Trichoncus saxicola (O. P.-Cambridge, 1861) — Europe, Russia
- Trichoncus scrofa Simon, 1884 — France, Mallorca, Italy
- Trichoncus similipes Denis, 1965 — Portugal
- Trichoncus sordidus Simon, 1884 — Europe
- Trichoncus steppensis Eskov, 1995 — Kazakhstan
- Trichoncus trifidus Denis, 1965 — Portugal
- Trichoncus uncinatus Denis, 1965 — Algeria
- Trichoncus varipes Denis, 1965 — Europe
- Trichoncus vasconicus Denis, 1944 — Palearctic
- Trichoncus villius Tanasevitch & Piterkina, 2007 — Kazakhstan

== Trichoncyboides ==
Trichoncyboides Wunderlich, 2008

- Trichoncyboides simoni (Lessert, 1904) — Switzerland, Germany, Austria, Czech Republic

== Trichopterna ==
Trichopterna Kulczynski, 1894

- Trichopterna cito (O. P.-Cambridge, 1872) — Palearctic
- Trichopterna cucurbitina (Simon, 1881) — Portugal, France
- Trichopterna grummi Tanasevitch, 1989 — Central Asia
- Trichopterna krueperi (Simon, 1884) — Greece
- Trichopterna loricata Denis, 1962 — Tanzania
- Trichopterna lucasi (O. P.-Cambridge, 1875) — Algeria
- Trichopterna macrophthalma Denis, 1962 — Tanzania
- Trichopterna rotundiceps Denis, 1962 — Tanzania
- Trichopterna seculifera Denis, 1962 — Tanzania

== Trichopternoides ==
Trichopternoides Wunderlich, 2008

- Trichopternoides thorelli (Westring, 1861) — Palearctic

== Triplogyna ==
Triplogyna Millidge, 1991

- Triplogyna ignitula (Keyserling, 1886) — Brazil
- Triplogyna major Millidge, 1991 — Colombia

== Troglohyphantes ==
Troglohyphantes Joseph, 1881

- Troglohyphantes adjaricus Tanasevitch, 1987 — Georgia
- Troglohyphantes affinis (Kulczynski, 1914) — Croatia, Bosnia-Hercegovina
- Troglohyphantes affirmatus (Simon, 1913) — Spain
- Troglohyphantes albicaudatus Bosmans, 2006 — Algeria
- Troglohyphantes albopictus Pesarini, 1989 — Italy
- Troglohyphantes alluaudi Fage, 1919 — Spain
- Troglohyphantes apenninicus Isaia, Mammola & Pantini, 2017 — Italy
- Troglohyphantes balazuci Dresco, 1956 — France
- Troglohyphantes birsteini Charitonov, 1947 — Russia, Georgia
- Troglohyphantes bolivarorum Machado, 1939 — Spain
- Troglohyphantes bolognai Brignoli, 1975 — Italy
- Troglohyphantes bonzanoi Brignoli, 1979 — Italy
- Troglohyphantes bornensis Isaia & Pantini, 2008 — Italy
- Troglohyphantes boudewijni Deeleman-Reinhold, 1974 — Montenegro
- Troglohyphantes brevipes Deeleman-Reinhold, 1978 — Bosnia-Hercegovina
- Troglohyphantes brignolii Deeleman-Reinhold, 1978 — Italy, Croatia
- Troglohyphantes bureschianus Deltshev, 1975 — Bulgaria
- Troglohyphantes caecus Fage, 1919 — France
- Troglohyphantes caligatus Pesarini, 1989 — Switzerland, Italy
- Troglohyphantes cantabricus Simon, 1911 — Spain
- Troglohyphantes caporiaccoi Brignoli, 1971 — Italy
- Troglohyphantes cavadinii Pesarini, 1989 — Italy
- Troglohyphantes cerberus (Simon, 1884) — France
- Troglohyphantes charitonovi Tanasevitch, 1987 — Russia
- Troglohyphantes cirtensis (Simon, 1910) — Algeria
- Troglohyphantes comottii Pesarini, 1989 — Italy
- Troglohyphantes confusus Kratochvil, 1939 — Eastern Europe
- Troglohyphantes croaticus (Chyzer, 1894) — Eastern Europe
- Troglohyphantes cruentus Brignoli, 1971 — Slovenia
- Troglohyphantes dalmaticus (Kulczynski, 1914) — Croatia, Macedonia
- Troglohyphantes deelemanae Tanasevitch, 1987 — Georgia
- Troglohyphantes dekkingae Deeleman-Reinhold, 1978 — Bosnia-Hercegovina
  - Troglohyphantes dekkingae pauciaculeatus Deeleman-Reinhold, 1978 — Bosnia-Hercegovina
- Troglohyphantes diabolicus Deeleman-Reinhold, 1978 — Slovenia
- Troglohyphantes dinaricus (Kratochvil, 1948) — Croatia
- Troglohyphantes diurnus Kratochvil, 1932 — Austria, Slovenia, Croatia
- Troglohyphantes dominici Pesarini, 1988 — Italy
- Troglohyphantes draconis Deeleman-Reinhold, 1978 — Macedonia
- Troglohyphantes drenskii Deltshev, 1973 — Bulgaria
- Troglohyphantes excavatus Fage, 1919 — Italy, Austria, Eastern Europe
- Troglohyphantes exul Thaler, 1987 — Italy
- Troglohyphantes fagei Roewer, 1931 — Germany, Austria, Italy
- Troglohyphantes fallax Deeleman-Reinhold, 1978 — Bosnia-Hercegovina
- Troglohyphantes fatalis Pesarini, 1988 — Italy
- Troglohyphantes fugax (Kulczynski, 1914) — Bosnia-Hercegovina
- Troglohyphantes furcifer (Simon, 1884) — Spain
- Troglohyphantes gamsi Deeleman-Reinhold, 1978 — Slovenia
- Troglohyphantes gestroi Fage, 1933 — Italy
- Troglohyphantes giachinoi Isaia & Mammola, 2018 — Italy
- Troglohyphantes giromettai (Kulczynski, 1914) — Croatia
- Troglohyphantes gladius Wunderlich, 1995 — Turkey
- Troglohyphantes gracilis Fage, 1919 — Slovenia
- Troglohyphantes gregori (Miller, 1947) — Czech Republic
- Troglohyphantes hadzii Kratochvil, 1934 — Bosnia-Hercegovina
- Troglohyphantes helsdingeni Deeleman-Reinhold, 1978 — Austria, Slovenia
- Troglohyphantes henroti Dresco, 1956 — France
- Troglohyphantes herculanus (Kulczynski, 1894) — Eastern Europe
- Troglohyphantes inermis Deeleman-Reinhold, 1978 — Macedonia
- Troglohyphantes iulianae Brignoli, 1971 — Italy
- Troglohyphantes jamatus Roewer, 1931 — Slovenia
- Troglohyphantes jeanneli Dumitrescu & Georgescu, 1970 — Romania
- Troglohyphantes juris Thaler, 1982 — Italy
- Troglohyphantes karawankorum Deeleman-Reinhold, 1978 — Austria, Slovenia
- Troglohyphantes karolianus Topçu, Türkes & Seyyar, 2008 — Turkey
- Troglohyphantes konradi Brignoli, 1975 — Italy
- Troglohyphantes kordunlikanus Deeleman-Reinhold, 1978 — Croatia
- Troglohyphantes kratochvili Drensky, 1935 — Macedonia
- Troglohyphantes labrada Wunderlich, 2012 — Canary Islands
- Troglohyphantes lakatnikensis Drensky, 1931 — Bulgaria
- Troglohyphantes lanai Isaia & Pantini, 2010 — Italy
- Troglohyphantes latzeli Thaler, 1986 — Austria
- Troglohyphantes lesserti Kratochvil, 1935 — Balkans
- Troglohyphantes lessinensis Caporiacco, 1936 — Italy
- Troglohyphantes liburnicus Caporiacco, 1927 — Balkans
- Troglohyphantes lucifer Isaia, Mammola & Pantini, 2017 — Italy
- Troglohyphantes lucifuga (Simon, 1884) — Europe
- Troglohyphantes marqueti (Simon, 1884) — France
  - Troglohyphantes marqueti pauciaculeatus Simon, 1929 — France
- Troglohyphantes microcymbium Pesarini, 2001 — Italy
- Troglohyphantes milleri (Kratochvil, 1948) — Bosnia-Hercegovina
- Troglohyphantes montanus Absolon & Kratochvil, 1932 — Bosnia-Hercegovina
- Troglohyphantes nigraerosae Brignoli, 1971 — Italy
- Troglohyphantes noricus (Thaler & Polenec, 1974) — Germany, Austria
- Troglohyphantes novicordis Thaler, 1978 — Austria
- Troglohyphantes numidus (Simon, 1911) — Algeria
- Troglohyphantes nyctalops Simon, 1911 — Spain
- Troglohyphantes orghidani Dumitrescu & Georgescu, 1977 — Romania
- Troglohyphantes oromii (Ribera & Blasco, 1986) — Canary Islands
- Troglohyphantes orpheus (Simon, 1884) — France
- Troglohyphantes paulusi Thaler, 2002 — Iran
- Troglohyphantes pavesii Pesarini, 1988 — Italy
- Troglohyphantes pedemontanus (Gozo, 1908) — Italy
- Troglohyphantes phragmitis (Simon, 1884) — France
- Troglohyphantes pisidicus Brignoli, 1971 — Turkey
- Troglohyphantes pluto Caporiacco, 1938 — Italy
- Troglohyphantes poleneci Wiehle, 1964 — Italy, Slovenia
- Troglohyphantes polyophthalmus Joseph, 1881 — Slovenia
- Troglohyphantes pretneri Deeleman-Reinhold, 1978 — Montenegro
- Troglohyphantes pugnax Deeleman-Reinhold, 1978 — Bosnia-Hercegovina, Croatia
- Troglohyphantes pumilio Denis, 1959 — France
- Troglohyphantes pyrenaeus Simon, 1907 — France
- Troglohyphantes racovitzai Dumitrescu & Georgescu, 1970 — Romania
- Troglohyphantes regalini Pesarini, 1989 — Italy
- Troglohyphantes roberti Deeleman-Reinhold, 1978 — Croatia
  - Troglohyphantes roberti dalmatensis Deeleman-Reinhold, 1978 — Croatia
- Troglohyphantes roquensis Barrientos & Fernández-Pérez, 2018 — Spain (Canary Islands)
- Troglohyphantes ruffoi Caporiacco, 1936 — Italy
- Troglohyphantes salax (Kulczynski, 1914) — Bosnia-Hercegovina, Croatia
- Troglohyphantes saouaf Bosmans, 2006 — Algeria, Tunisia
- Troglohyphantes sbordonii Brignoli, 1975 — Austria, Italy, Slovenia
- Troglohyphantes schenkeli (Miller, 1937) — Slovakia
- Troglohyphantes sciakyi Pesarini, 1989 — Italy
- Troglohyphantes scientificus Deeleman-Reinhold, 1978 — Italy, Slovenia
- Troglohyphantes similis Fage, 1919 — Slovenia
- Troglohyphantes simoni Fage, 1919 — France
- Troglohyphantes sketi Deeleman-Reinhold, 1978 — Slovenia, Croatia
- Troglohyphantes solitarius Fage, 1919 — France
- Troglohyphantes sordellii (Pavesi, 1875) — Switzerland, Italy
- Troglohyphantes spatulifer Pesarini, 2001 — Italy
- Troglohyphantes spinipes Fage, 1919 — Slovenia
- Troglohyphantes strandi Absolon & Kratochvil, 1932 — Croatia
- Troglohyphantes subalpinus Thaler, 1967 — Germany, Austria, Croatia
- Troglohyphantes svilajensis (Kratochvil, 1948) — Croatia
  - Troglohyphantes svilajensis bosnicus (Kratochvil, 1948) — Bosnia-Hercegovina
  - Troglohyphantes svilajensis noctiphilus (Kratochvil, 1948) — Croatia
- Troglohyphantes tauriscus Thaler, 1982 — Austria
- Troglohyphantes thaleri Miller & Polenec, 1975 — Austria, Slovenia
- Troglohyphantes trispinosus Miller & Polenec, 1975 — Slovenia
- Troglohyphantes troglodytes (Kulczynski, 1914) — Bosnia-Hercegovina, Croatia
- Troglohyphantes turcicus Topçu, Türkeş, Seyyar, Demircan & Karabulut, 2014 — Turkey
- Troglohyphantes typhlonetiformis Absolon & Kratochvil, 1932 — Austria, Slovenia
- Troglohyphantes vicinus Miller & Polenec, 1975 — Slovenia
- Troglohyphantes vignai Brignoli, 1971 — Italy
- Troglohyphantes wiebesi Deeleman-Reinhold, 1978 — Bosnia-Hercegovina
- Troglohyphantes wiehlei Miller & Polenec, 1975 — Austria, Eastern Europe
- Troglohyphantes zanoni Pesarini, 1988 — Italy

== Troxochrota ==
Troxochrota Kulczynski, 1894

- Troxochrota kashmirica (Caporiacco, 1935) — Kashmir
- Troxochrota scabra Kulczynski, 1894 — Europe, Russia

== Troxochrus ==
Troxochrus Simon, 1884

- Troxochrus apertus Tanasevitch, 2011 — Greece, Turkey
- Troxochrus laevithorax Miller, 1970 — Angola
- Troxochrus rugulosus (Westring, 1851) — Sweden
- Troxochrus scabriculus (Westring, 1851) — Palearctic
- Troxochrus triangularis Tanasevitch, 2013 — Israel

== Tubercithorax ==
Tubercithorax Eskov, 1988

- Tubercithorax furcifer Eskov, 1988 — Russia
- Tubercithorax subarcticus (Tanasevitch, 1984) — Russia

== Tunagyna ==
Tunagyna Chamberlin & Ivie, 1933

- Tunagyna debilis (Banks, 1892) — Russia, Alaska, Canada, USA

== Turbinellina ==
Turbinellina Millidge, 1993

- Turbinellina nigra (Millidge, 1991) — Chile, Argentina

== Turinyphia ==
Turinyphia van Helsdingen, 1982

- Turinyphia cavernicola Wunderlich, 2008 — Azores
- Turinyphia clairi (Simon, 1884) — Southern Europe
- Turinyphia maderiana (Schenkel, 1938) — Madeira
- Turinyphia yunohamensis (Bösenberg & Strand, 1906) — China, Korea, Japan

== Tusukuru ==
Tusukuru Eskov, 1993

- Tusukuru hartlandianus (Emerton, 1913) — USA
- Tusukuru tamburinus Eskov, 1993 — Russia

== Tutaibo ==
Tutaibo Chamberlin, 1916

- Tutaibo anglicanus (Hentz, 1850) — USA
- Tutaibo debilipes Chamberlin, 1916 — Peru
- Tutaibo formosus Millidge, 1991 — Peru
- Tutaibo fucosus (Keyserling, 1891) — Brazil
- Tutaibo niger (O. P.-Cambridge, 1882) — Brazil
- Tutaibo phoeniceus (O. P.-Cambridge, 1894) — Mexico, Guatemala
- Tutaibo pullus Millidge, 1991 — Colombia
- Tutaibo rubescens Millidge, 1991 — Colombia
- Tutaibo rusticellus (Keyserling, 1891) — Brazil
- Tutaibo velox (Keyserling, 1886) — Brazil

== Tybaertiella ==
Tybaertiella Jocque, 1979

- Tybaertiella convexa (Holm, 1962) — West, Central, East Africa
- Tybaertiella krugeri (Simon, 1894) — Africa
- Tybaertiella peniculifera Jocque, 1979 — Ivory Coast, Nigeria, Ethiopia

== Typhistes ==
Typhistes Simon, 1894

- Typhistes antilope Simon, 1894 — Sri Lanka
- Typhistes comatus Simon, 1894 — Sri Lanka
- Typhistes elephas Berland, 1922 — Ethiopia
- Typhistes gloriosus Jocque, 1984 — South Africa

== Typhlonyphia ==
Typhlonyphia Kratochvil, 1936

- Typhlonyphia reimoseri Kratochvil, 1936 — Eastern Europe
  - Typhlonyphia reimoseri meridionalis Kratochvil, 1978 — Croatia

== Typhochrestinus ==
Typhochrestinus Eskov, 1990

- Typhochrestinus titulifer Eskov, 1990 — Russia

== Typhochrestoides ==
Typhochrestoides Eskov, 1990

- Typhochrestoides baikalensis Eskov, 1990 — Russia

== Typhochrestus ==
Typhochrestus Simon, 1884

- Typhochrestus acoreensis Wunderlich, 1992 — Azores
- Typhochrestus alticola Denis, 1953 — France
- Typhochrestus berniae Bosmans, 2008 — Spain
- Typhochrestus bifurcatus Simon, 1884 — Spain, Algeria
- Typhochrestus bogarti Bosmans, 1990 — Portugal, Spain, France, Morocco
- Typhochrestus brucei Tullgren, 1955 — Sweden
- Typhochrestus chiosensis Wunderlich, 1995 — Greece, Turkey
- Typhochrestus ciliiunti Barrientos & Febrer, 2018 — Spain (Menorca)
- Typhochrestus curvicervix (Denis, 1964) — Tunisia
- Typhochrestus cyrenanius Denis, 1964 — Libya
- Typhochrestus digitatus (O. P.-Cambridge, 1872) — Palearctic
- Typhochrestus djellalensis Bosmans & Bouragba, 1992 — Algeria
- Typhochrestus dubius Denis, 1949 — France
- Typhochrestus epidaurensis Wunderlich, 1995 — Greece
- Typhochrestus fortunatus Thaler, 1984 — Canary Islands
- Typhochrestus hesperius Thaler, 1984 — Canary Islands
- Typhochrestus ikarianus Tanasevitch, 2011 — Greece
- Typhochrestus inflatus Thaler, 1980 — Switzerland to Central Asia
- Typhochrestus longisulcus Gnelitsa, 2006 — Ukraine
- Typhochrestus mauretanicus Bosmans, 1990 — Morocco, Algeria
- Typhochrestus meron Tanasevitch, 2013 — Israel
- Typhochrestus montanus Wunderlich, 1987 — Canary Islands
- Typhochrestus numidicus Bosmans, 1990 — Algeria
- Typhochrestus paradorensis Wunderlich, 1987 — Canary Islands
- Typhochrestus sardus Bosmans, 2008 — Sardinia
- Typhochrestus simoni Lessert, 1907 — Europe
- Typhochrestus sireti Bosmans, 2008 — Spain
- Typhochrestus spatulatus Bosmans, 1990 — Morocco, Algeria
- Typhochrestus splendidus Bosmans, 1990 — Algeria
- Typhochrestus sylviae Hauge, 1968 — Norway
- Typhochrestus uintanus (Chamberlin & Ivie, 1939) — USA
- Typhochrestus ultimus Bosmans, 1990 — Algeria
- Typhochrestus virilis Bosmans, 1990 — Algeria

== Uahuka ==
Uahuka Berland, 1935

- Uahuka affinis Berland, 1935 — Marquesas Islands
- Uahuka spinifrons Berland, 1935 — Marquesas Islands

== Uapou ==
Uapou Berland, 1935

- Uapou maculata Berland, 1935 — Marquesas Islands

== Ulugurella ==
Ulugurella Jocque & Scharff, 1986

- Ulugurella longimana Jocque & Scharff, 1986 — Tanzania

== Ummeliata ==
Ummeliata Strand, 1942

- Ummeliata angulituberis (Oi, 1960) — Russia, Korea, Japan
- Ummeliata erigonoides (Oi, 1960) — Japan
- Ummeliata feminea (Bösenberg & Strand, 1906) — Russia, China, Korea, Japan
- Ummeliata insecticeps (Bösenberg & Strand, 1906) — Russia to Vietnam, Taiwan, Japan
- Ummeliata onoi Saito, 1993 — Japan
- Ummeliata osakaensis (Oi, 1960) — Russia, Japan
- Ummeliata saitoi Matsuda & Ono, 2001 — Japan
- Ummeliata sibirica (Eskov, 1980) — Russia
- Ummeliata xiaowutai Han & Zhang, 2014 — China

== Uralophantes ==
Uralophantes Esyunin, 1992

- Uralophantes troitskensis Esyunin, 1992 — Russia

== Ussurigone ==
Ussurigone Eskov, 1993

- Ussurigone melanocephala Eskov, 1993 — Russia

== Uusitaloia ==
Uusitaloia Marusik, Koponen & Danilov, 2001

- Uusitaloia transbaicalica Marusik, Koponen & Danilov, 2001 — Russia
- Uusitaloia wrangeliana Marusik & Koponen, 2009 — Russia

== Vagiphantes ==
Vagiphantes Saaristo & Tanasevitch, 2004

- Vagiphantes vaginatus (Tanasevitch, 1983) — Central Asia

== Venia ==
Venia Seyfulina & Jocque, 2009

- Venia kakamega Seyfulina & Jocque, 2009 — Kenya

== Vermontia ==
Vermontia Millidge, 1984

- Vermontia thoracica (Emerton, 1913) — USA, Canada, Russia

== Vesicapalpus ==
Vesicapalpus Millidge, 1991

- Vesicapalpus serranus Rodrigues & Ott, 2006 — Brazil
- Vesicapalpus simplex Millidge, 1991 — Brazil, Argentina

== Vietnagone ==
Vietnagone Tanasevitch, 2019

- Vietnagone rugulosa (Song & Li, 2010) — China
- Vietnagone sylvatica Tanasevitch, 2019 — Vietnam

== Viktorium ==
Viktorium Eskov, 1988

- Viktorium putoranicum Eskov, 1988 — Russia

== Wabasso ==
Wabasso Millidge, 1984

- Wabasso cacuminatus Millidge, 1984 — Russia, Canada, USA
- Wabasso hilairoides Eskov, 1988 — Russia
- Wabasso koponeni Tanasevitch, 2006 — Russia
- Wabasso millidgei Eskov, 1988 — Russia
- Wabasso quaestio (Chamberlin, 1949) — Canada, Greenland
- Wabasso replicatus (Holm, 1950) — Scotland to Russia
- Wabasso saaristoi Tanasevitch, 2006 — Russia
- Wabasso tungusicus Eskov, 1988 — Russia

== Walckenaeria ==
Walckenaeria Blackwall, 1833

- Walckenaeria abantensis Wunderlich, 1995 — Greece, Turkey
- Walckenaeria aberdarensis (Holm, 1962) — Kenya
- Walckenaeria acuminata Blackwall, 1833 — Palearctic
- Walckenaeria aenea Millidge, 1983 — Mexico
- Walckenaeria afur Thaler, 1984 — Canary Islands
- Walckenaeria aksoyi Seyyar, Demir & Türkes, 2008 — Turkey
- Walckenaeria alba Wunderlich, 1987 — Canary Islands
- Walckenaeria allopatriae Jocque & Scharff, 1986 — Tanzania
- Walckenaeria alticeps (Denis, 1952) — Europe to Central Asia
- Walckenaeria anceps Millidge, 1983 — Canada
- Walckenaeria angelica Millidge, 1979 — Italy
- Walckenaeria angustifrons (Simon, 1884) — France
- Walckenaeria antica (Wider, 1834) — Palearctic
- Walckenaeria aprilis Millidge, 1983 — USA
- Walckenaeria arcana Millidge, 1983 — Mexico
- Walckenaeria arctica Millidge, 1983 — USA, Canada
- Walckenaeria asymmetrica Song & Li, 2011 — China
- Walckenaeria atrotibialis (O. P.-Cambridge, 1878) — Holarctic
- Walckenaeria auranticeps (Emerton, 1882) — Russia, Canada, USA
- Walckenaeria aurata Millidge, 1983 — Mexico
- Walckenaeria baborensis Bosmans, 1993 — Algeria
- Walckenaeria basarukini Eskov & Marusik, 1994 — Russia
- Walckenaeria bifasciculata Tanasevitch, 1987 — Azerbaijan, Armenia
- Walckenaeria bifida Millidge, 1983 — USA
- Walckenaeria blanda Millidge, 1983 — USA
- Walckenaeria breviaria (Crosby & Bishop, 1931) — USA
- Walckenaeria brevicornis (Emerton, 1882) — USA
- Walckenaeria brucei (Tullgren, 1955) — Sweden
- Walckenaeria camposi Wunderlich, 1992 — Canary Islands
- Walckenaeria caobangensis Tu & Li, 2004 — Vietnam
- Walckenaeria capito (Westring, 1861) — Holarctic
- Walckenaeria carolina Millidge, 1983 — USA
- Walckenaeria castanea (Emerton, 1882) — USA, Canada
- Walckenaeria cavernicola Wunderlich, 1992 — Canary Islands
- Walckenaeria chikunii Saito & Ono, 2001 — Japan
- Walckenaeria chiyokoae Saito, 1988 — Japan
- Walckenaeria christae Wunderlich, 1995 — Greece
- Walckenaeria cirriceps Thaler, 1996 — Greece
- Walckenaeria clavicornis (Emerton, 1882) — Holarctic
- Walckenaeria claviloba Wunderlich, 1995 — Crete
- Walckenaeria clavipalpis Millidge, 1983 — USA, Canada
- Walckenaeria cognata Holm, 1984 — Tanzania
- Walckenaeria columbia Millidge, 1983 — USA, Canada
- Walckenaeria communis (Emerton, 1882) — USA, Canada, Alaska
- Walckenaeria coniceps Thaler, 1996 — Greece
- Walckenaeria coreana (Paik, 1983) — Korea
- Walckenaeria corniculans (O. P.-Cambridge, 1875) — Europe, North Africa
- Walckenaeria cornuella (Chamberlin & Ivie, 1939) — USA, Canada
- Walckenaeria cretaensis Wunderlich, 1995 — Crete
- Walckenaeria crocata (Simon, 1884) — Canary Islands, Algeria
- Walckenaeria crocea Millidge, 1983 — Mexico
- Walckenaeria crosbyi (Fage, 1938) — Costa Rica
- Walckenaeria cucullata (C. L. Koch, 1836) — Palearctic
- Walckenaeria cuspidata Blackwall, 1833 — Palearctic
  - Walckenaeria cuspidata brevicula (Crosby & Bishop, 1931) — USA, Canada, Alaska, Greenland
  - Walckenaeria cuspidata obsoleta Chyzer & Kulczynski, 1894 — Hungary
- Walckenaeria cyprusensis Wunderlich, 1995 — Cyprus
- Walckenaeria dahaituoensis Song & Li, 2011 — China
- Walckenaeria dalmasi (Simon, 1914) — Portugal, France
- Walckenaeria denisi Thaler, 1984 — Canary Islands
- Walckenaeria digitata (Emerton, 1913) — USA, Canada
- Walckenaeria directa (O. P.-Cambridge, 1874) — USA, Canada, Alaska
- Walckenaeria discolor Millidge, 1983 — Mexico
- Walckenaeria dixiana (Chamberlin & Ivie, 1944) — USA
- Walckenaeria dondalei Millidge, 1983 — Canada
- Walckenaeria dulciacensis (Denis, 1949) — France
- Walckenaeria dysderoides (Wider, 1834) — Palearctic
- Walckenaeria elgonensis Holm, 1984 — Kenya, Uganda
- Walckenaeria emarginata Millidge, 1983 — USA
- Walckenaeria erythrina (Simon, 1884) — Corsica, Morocco, Algeria, Tunisia
- Walckenaeria exigua Millidge, 1983 — USA, Canada
- Walckenaeria extraterrestris Bosmans, 1993 — Algeria, Greece
- Walckenaeria faceta Millidge, 1983 — Mexico
- Walckenaeria fallax Millidge, 1983 — Canada
- Walckenaeria ferruginea Seo, 1991 — China, Korea
- Walckenaeria floridiana Millidge, 1983 — USA
- Walckenaeria fraudatrix Millidge, 1983 — Russia, Mongolia, Alaska, Canada
- Walckenaeria furcillata (Menge, 1869) — Palearctic
- Walckenaeria fusca Rosca, 1935 — Romania, Ukraine
- Walckenaeria fusciceps Millidge, 1983 — Canada
- Walckenaeria fuscocephala Wunderlich, 1987 — Canary Islands
- Walckenaeria galilea Tanasevitch, 2016 — Israel
- Walckenaeria gertschi Millidge, 1983 — Mexico
- Walckenaeria gologolensis Scharff, 1990 — Tanzania
- Walckenaeria golovatchi Eskov & Marusik, 1994 — Russia, Japan
- Walckenaeria gomerensis Wunderlich, 1987 — Canary Islands
- Walckenaeria grancanariensis Wunderlich, 2011 — Canary Islands
- Walckenaeria grandis (Wunderlich, 1992) — Azores
- Walckenaeria hamus Wunderlich, 1995 — Crete
- Walckenaeria heimbergi Bosmans, 2007 — Morocco
- Walckenaeria helenae Millidge, 1983 — USA
- Walckenaeria hierropalma Wunderlich, 1987 — Canary Islands
- Walckenaeria ichifusaensis Saito & Ono, 2001 — Japan
- Walckenaeria incisa (O. P.-Cambridge, 1871) — Europe
- Walckenaeria incompleta Wunderlich, 1992 — Canary Islands
- Walckenaeria indirecta (O. P.-Cambridge, 1874) — USA, Canada
- Walckenaeria inflexa (Westring, 1861) — Sweden
- Walckenaeria insperata Millidge, 1979 — Italy
- Walckenaeria intoleranda (Keyserling, 1886) — Costa Rica, Panama, Colombia
- Walckenaeria iviei Millidge, 1983 — Mexico
- Walckenaeria jinlin Yin & Bao, 2012 — China
- Walckenaeria jocquei Holm, 1984 — Malawi
- Walckenaeria kabyliana Bosmans, 1993 — Algeria
- Walckenaeria karpinskii (O. P.-Cambridge, 1873) — Holarctic
- Walckenaeria katanda Marusik, Hippa & Koponen, 1996 — Russia, Kazakhstan
- Walckenaeria kazakhstanica Eskov, 1995 — Russia, Kazakhstan
- Walckenaeria kikogensis Scharff, 1990 — Tanzania
- Walckenaeria kochi (O. P.-Cambridge, 1872) — Palearctic, Quebec
- Walckenaeria koenboutjei Baert, 1994 — Russia
- Walckenaeria korobeinikovi Esyunin & Efimik, 1996 — Russia, Japan
- Walckenaeria kulalensis Holm, 1984 — Kenya
- Walckenaeria languida (Simon, 1914) — Southern, Central Europe, North Africa
- Walckenaeria latens Millidge, 1983 — USA
- Walckenaeria lepida (Kulczynski, 1885) — Holarctic
- Walckenaeria maesta Millidge, 1983 — USA
- Walckenaeria mariannae Bosmans, 1993 — Algeria
- Walckenaeria martensi Wunderlich, 1972 — India, Nepal
- Walckenaeria mauensis Holm, 1984 — Kenya
- Walckenaeria mengei Bösenberg, 1902 — Germany
- Walckenaeria meruensis Tullgren, 1910 — Tanzania
- Walckenaeria mesus (Chamberlin, 1949) — USA
- Walckenaeria mexicana Millidge, 1983 — Mexico
- Walckenaeria microps Holm, 1984 — Kenya, Uganda
- Walckenaeria microspinosa Wunderlich, 2012 — Canary Islands
- Walckenaeria microspiralis Millidge, 1983 — USA, Canada
- Walckenaeria minuscula Holm, 1984 — Kenya
- Walckenaeria minuta (Emerton, 1882) — USA
- Walckenaeria mitrata (Menge, 1868) — Palearctic
- Walckenaeria monoceras (Chamberlin & Ivie, 1947) — USA, Alaska
- Walckenaeria monoceros (Wider, 1834) — Europe to Kyrgyzstan
- Walckenaeria neglecta Bosmans, 1993 — Algeria
- Walckenaeria ngorongoroensis Holm, 1984 — Tanzania
- Walckenaeria nigeriensis Locket & Russell-Smith, 1980 — Nigeria, Kenya
- Walckenaeria nishikawai Saito, 1986 — Russia, Japan
- Walckenaeria nodosa O. P.-Cambridge, 1873 — Palearctic
- Walckenaeria nudipalpis (Westring, 1851) — Palearctic
- Walckenaeria obtusa Blackwall, 1836 — Palearctic
- Walckenaeria occidentalis Millidge, 1983 — USA
- Walckenaeria ocularis Holm, 1984 — Kenya
- Walckenaeria oregona Millidge, 1983 — USA
- Walckenaeria orghidani Georgescu, 1977 — Cuba
- Walckenaeria orientalis (Oliger, 1985) — Russia, Korea, Japan
- Walckenaeria pallida (Emerton, 1882) — USA, Canada
- Walckenaeria palmgreni Eskov & Marusik, 1994 — Russia, Mongolia
- Walckenaeria palmierro Wunderlich, 1987 — Canary Islands
- Walckenaeria palustris Millidge, 1983 — Canada
- Walckenaeria parvicornis Wunderlich, 1995 — Mongolia
- Walckenaeria pellax Millidge, 1983 — USA, Canada, Alaska
- Walckenaeria perdita (Chamberlin, 1949) — USA
- Walckenaeria picetorum (Palmgren, 1976) — Finland, Russia
- Walckenaeria pinocchio (Kaston, 1945) — USA, Canada
- Walckenaeria pinoensis Wunderlich, 1992 — Canary Islands
- Walckenaeria placida (Banks, 1892) — USA
- Walckenaeria plumata Millidge, 1979 — Italy
- Walckenaeria prominens Millidge, 1983 — Canada
- Walckenaeria puella Millidge, 1983 — USA
- Walckenaeria pullata Millidge, 1983 — USA, Canada
- Walckenaeria pyrenaea (Denis, 1952) — France
- Walckenaeria reclusa Millidge, 1983 — USA
- Walckenaeria redneri Millidge, 1983 — USA, Canada
- Walckenaeria rufula Millidge, 1983 — Mexico
- Walckenaeria rutilis Millidge, 1983 — Mexico
- Walckenaeria ruwenzoriensis (Holm, 1962) — Congo, Uganda
- Walckenaeria saetigera Tanasevitch, 2011 — India
- Walckenaeria saniuana (Chamberlin & Ivie, 1939) — USA
- Walckenaeria serrata Millidge, 1983 — USA
- Walckenaeria simplex Chyzer, 1894 — Central, Eastern Europe
- Walckenaeria solivaga Millidge, 1983 — USA
- Walckenaeria spiralis (Emerton, 1882) — Russia, Alaska, Canada, USA
- Walckenaeria stepposa Tanasevitch & Piterkina, 2007 — Kazakhstan
- Walckenaeria striata Wunderlich, 1987 — Canary Islands
- Walckenaeria stylifrons (O. P.-Cambridge, 1875) — Europe
- Walckenaeria subdirecta Millidge, 1983 — USA, Canada
- Walckenaeria subpallida Millidge, 1983 — USA
- Walckenaeria subspiralis Millidge, 1983 — USA, Canada
- Walckenaeria subterranea Wunderlich, 2011 — Canary Islands
- Walckenaeria subvigilax Millidge, 1983 — USA
- Walckenaeria suspecta (Kulczynski, 1882) — Poland, Slovakia
- Walckenaeria tanzaniensis Jocque & Scharff, 1986 — Tanzania
- Walckenaeria teideensis Wunderlich, 1992 — Canary Islands
- Walckenaeria tenella Millidge, 1983 — USA, Canada
- Walckenaeria tenuitibialis Bosmans, 1993 — Algeria
- Walckenaeria teres Millidge, 1983 — Canada
- Walckenaeria thrinax (Chamberlin & Ivie, 1933) — USA
- Walckenaeria tibialis (Emerton, 1882) — USA, Canada
- Walckenaeria tilos Wunderlich, 2011 — Canary Islands
- Walckenaeria torta Bosmans, 1993 — Algeria
- Walckenaeria tricornis (Emerton, 1882) — USA, Canada
- Walckenaeria tumida (Crosby & Bishop, 1931) — USA, Canada
- Walckenaeria turbulenta Bosmans, 1993 — Algeria
- Walckenaeria tystchenkoi Eskov & Marusik, 1994 — Russia
- Walckenaeria uenoi Saito & Irie, 1992 — Japan
- Walckenaeria unicornis O. P.-Cambridge, 1861 — Palearctic
- Walckenaeria uzungwensis Scharff, 1990 — Tanzania
- Walckenaeria vigilax (Blackwall, 1853) — Holarctic
- Walckenaeria vilbasteae Wunderlich, 1979 — Finland, Estonia
- Walckenaeria weber (Chamberlin, 1949) — USA
- Walckenaeria westringi Strand, 1903 — Norway
- Walckenaeria wunderlichi Tanasevitch, 1983 — Central Asia
- Walckenaeria yunnanensis Xia et al., 2001 — China

== Walckenaerianus ==
Walckenaerianus Wunderlich, 1995

- Walckenaerianus aimakensis Wunderlich, 1995 — Russia, Mongolia
- Walckenaerianus esyunini Tanasevitch, 2004 — Bulgaria, Russia, Kazakhstan

== Wiehlea ==
Wiehlea Braun, 1959

- Wiehlea calcarifera (Simon, 1884) — Western Europe

== Wiehlenarius ==
Wiehlenarius Eskov, 1990

- Wiehlenarius boreus Eskov, 1990 — Russia
- Wiehlenarius tirolensis (Schenkel, 1939) — Switzerland, Austria, Greece

== Wubana ==
Wubana Chamberlin, 1919

- Wubana atypica Chamberlin & Ivie, 1936 — USA
- Wubana drassoides (Emerton, 1882) — USA
- Wubana ornata Chamberlin & Ivie, 1936 — USA
- Wubana pacifica (Banks, 1896) — USA
- Wubana reminiscens Chamberlin, 1949 — USA
- Wubana suprema Chamberlin & Ivie, 1936 — USA
- Wubana utahana Chamberlin & Ivie, 1936 — USA

== Wubanoides ==
Wubanoides Eskov, 1986

- Wubanoides fissus (Kulczynski, 1926) — Russia, Japan
- Wubanoides uralensis (Pakhorukov, 1981) — Russia, Mongolia
  - Wubanoides uralensis lithodytes Schikora, 2004 — Central, Eastern Europe

== Yakutopus ==
Yakutopus Eskov, 1990

- Yakutopus xerophilus Eskov, 1990 — Russia

== Yuelushannus ==
Yuelushannus Irfan, Zhou, Bashir, Mukhtar & Peng, 2020

- Yuelushannus alatus Irfan, Zhou, Bashir, Mukhtar & Peng, 2020 — China
- Yuelushannus barbatus Irfan, Zhou, Bashir, Mukhtar & Peng, 2020 — China

== Zerogone ==
Zerogone Eskov & Marusik, 1994

- Zerogone submissella (Strand, 1907) — Russia

== Zhezhoulinyphia ==
Zhezhoulinyphia Irfan, Zhou & Peng, 2019

- Zhezhoulinyphia caperata Irfan, Zhou & Peng, 2019 — China
- Zhezhoulinyphia denticulata Irfan, Zhou & Peng, 2019 — China
- Zhezhoulinyphia yadongensis (Hu & Li, 1987) — China

== Zilephus ==
Zilephus Simon, 1902

- Zilephus granulosus Simon, 1902 — Argentina

== Zornella ==
Zornella Jackson, 1932

- Zornella armata (Banks, 1906) — USA, Canada, Alaska
- Zornella cryptodon (Chamberlin, 1920) — USA, Canada
- Zornella cultrigera (L. Koch, 1879) — Palearctic

== Zygottus ==
Zygottus Chamberlin, 1949

- Zygottus corvallis Chamberlin, 1949 — USA
- Zygottus oregonus Chamberlin, 1949 — USA

== See also ==
- List of Linyphiidae species (A–H)
- List of Linyphiidae species (I–P)
