= Simplicistilus =

Scientific classification
- Kingdom: Animalia
- Phylum: Arthropoda
- Subphylum: Chelicerata
- Class: Arachnida
- Order: Araneae
- Infraorder: Araneomorphae
- Family: Linyphiidae
- Genus: Simplicistilus; Locket, 1968
- Species: S. tanuekes

Binomial name
- Simplicistilus tanuekes Locket, 1968

Genus of spiders

Simplicistilus is a monotypic genus of African sheet weavers containing the single species, Simplicistilus tanuekes. It was first described by G. H. Locket in 1968, and has only been found in Central Africa.
