= Tomohyphantes =

Scientific classification
- Kingdom: Animalia
- Phylum: Arthropoda
- Subphylum: Chelicerata
- Class: Arachnida
- Order: Araneae
- Infraorder: Araneomorphae
- Family: Linyphiidae
- Genus: Tomohyphantes; Millidge, 1995

Type species
- T. niger Millidge, 1995

Species
- 2, see text

Genus of spiders

Tomohyphantes is a genus of Indonesian sheet weavers that was first described by Alfred Frank Millidge in 1995.

== Species ==
As of June 2019 it contains only two species.

- Tomohyphantes niger Millidge, 1995 – Indonesia (Krakatau)
- Tomohyphantes opacus Millidge, 1995 – Indonesia (Krakatau)
