= Scandichrestus =

Scientific classification
- Kingdom: Animalia
- Phylum: Arthropoda
- Subphylum: Chelicerata
- Class: Arachnida
- Order: Araneae
- Infraorder: Araneomorphae
- Family: Linyphiidae
- Genus: Scandichrestus; Wunderlich, 1995
- Species: S. tenuis

Binomial name
- Scandichrestus tenuis (Holm, 1943)

Genus of spiders

Scandichrestus is a monotypic genus of sheet-weaving spiders containing the single species, Scandichrestus tenuis. It was first described by J. Wunderlich in 1995, and has only been found in Russia, Finland, and Sweden.
