= Thainetes =

Scientific classification
- Kingdom: Animalia
- Phylum: Arthropoda
- Subphylum: Chelicerata
- Class: Arachnida
- Order: Araneae
- Infraorder: Araneomorphae
- Family: Linyphiidae
- Genus: Thainetes; Millidge, 1995
- Species: T. tristis

Binomial name
- Thainetes tristis Millidge, 1995

Genus of spiders

Thainetes is a monotypic genus of Southeast Asian sheet weavers containing the single species, Thainetes tristis. It was first described by Alfred Frank Millidge in 1995, and has only been found in Thailand.
