= Zilephus =

Scientific classification
- Kingdom: Animalia
- Phylum: Arthropoda
- Subphylum: Chelicerata
- Class: Arachnida
- Order: Araneae
- Infraorder: Araneomorphae
- Family: Linyphiidae
- Genus: Zilephus; Simon, 1902
- Species: Z. granulosus

Binomial name
- Zilephus granulosus Simon, 1902

Genus of spiders

Zilephus is a genus of dwarf spiders containing the single species, Zilephus granulosus. It was first described by Eugène Simon in 1902, and is only found in Argentina.
