= Traematosisis =

Scientific classification
- Kingdom: Animalia
- Phylum: Arthropoda
- Subphylum: Chelicerata
- Class: Arachnida
- Order: Araneae
- Infraorder: Araneomorphae
- Family: Linyphiidae
- Genus: Traematosisis; Bishop & Crosby, 1938
- Species: T. bispinosus

Binomial name
- Traematosisis bispinosus (Emerton, 1911)

Genus of spiders

Traematosisis is a monotypic genus of American sheet weavers containing the single species, Traematosisis bispinosus. It was first described by S. C. Bishop & C. R. Crosby in 1938, and is only found in the United States.
