= Tegulinus =

Scientific classification
- Kingdom: Animalia
- Phylum: Arthropoda
- Subphylum: Chelicerata
- Class: Arachnida
- Order: Araneae
- Infraorder: Araneomorphae
- Family: Linyphiidae
- Genus: Tegulinus; Tanasevitch, 2017

Type species
- T. sumatranus Tanasevitch, 2017

Species
- 2, see text

Genus of spiders

Tegulinus is a genus of dwarf spiders first described by A. V. Tanasevitch in 2017.

== Species ==
As of August 2021 it contains two species.

- Tegulinus bifurcatus Tanasevitch, 2017 — Indonesia (Sumatra)
- Tegulinus sumatranus Tanasevitch, 2017 — Indonesia (Sumatra)
