= Spanioplanus =

Scientific classification
- Kingdom: Animalia
- Phylum: Arthropoda
- Subphylum: Chelicerata
- Class: Arachnida
- Order: Araneae
- Infraorder: Araneomorphae
- Family: Linyphiidae
- Genus: Spanioplanus; Millidge, 1991
- Species: S. mitis

Binomial name
- Spanioplanus mitis Millidge, 1991

Genus of spiders

Spanioplanus is a monotypic genus of South American sheet weavers containing the single species, Spanioplanus mitis. It was first described by Alfred Frank Millidge in 1991, and has only been found in Peru and Venezuela.
