= Vesicapalpus =

Scientific classification
- Kingdom: Animalia
- Phylum: Arthropoda
- Subphylum: Chelicerata
- Class: Arachnida
- Order: Araneae
- Infraorder: Araneomorphae
- Family: Linyphiidae
- Genus: Vesicapalpus; Millidge, 1991

Type species
- V. simplex Millidge, 1991

Species
- 2, see text

Genus of spiders

Vesicapalpus is a genus of South American sheet weavers that was first described by Alfred Frank Millidge in 1991.

== Species ==
As of June 2019 it contains only two species:

- Vesicapalpus serranus Rodrigues & Ott, 2006 – Brazil
- Vesicapalpus simplex Millidge, 1991 – Brazil, Argentina
