= Wiehlea =

Scientific classification
- Kingdom: Animalia
- Phylum: Arthropoda
- Subphylum: Chelicerata
- Class: Arachnida
- Order: Araneae
- Infraorder: Araneomorphae
- Family: Linyphiidae
- Genus: Wiehlea; Braun, 1959
- Species: W. calcarifera

Binomial name
- Wiehlea calcarifera (Simon, 1884)

Genus of spiders

Wiehlea is a monotypic genus of European sheet weavers containing the single species, Wiehlea calcarifera. It was first described by R. Braun in 1959, and is only found in Europe.
