= Totua =

Scientific classification
- Kingdom: Animalia
- Phylum: Arthropoda
- Subphylum: Chelicerata
- Class: Arachnida
- Order: Araneae
- Infraorder: Araneomorphae
- Family: Linyphiidae
- Genus: Totua; Keyserling, 1891
- Species: T. gracilipes

Binomial name
- Totua gracilipes Keyserling, 1891

Genus of spiders

Totua is a monotypic genus of Brazilian sheet weavers containing the single species, Totua gracilipes. It was first described by Eugen von Keyserling in 1891, and is only found in Brazil.
