= Tojinium =

Scientific classification
- Kingdom: Animalia
- Phylum: Arthropoda
- Subphylum: Chelicerata
- Class: Arachnida
- Order: Araneae
- Infraorder: Araneomorphae
- Family: Linyphiidae
- Genus: Tojinium; Saito & Ono, 2001
- Species: T. japonicum

Binomial name
- Tojinium japonicum Saito & Ono, 2001

Genus of spiders

Tojinium is a monotypic genus of Japanese sheet weavers containing the single species, Tojinium japonicum. It was first described by H. Saito & H. Ono in 2001, and is only found in Japan.
