= Ringina =

Scientific classification
- Kingdom: Animalia
- Phylum: Arthropoda
- Subphylum: Chelicerata
- Class: Arachnida
- Order: Araneae
- Infraorder: Araneomorphae
- Family: Linyphiidae
- Genus: Ringina; Tambs-Lyche, 1954
- Species: R. antarctica

Binomial name
- Ringina antarctica (Hickman, 1939)

Genus of spiders

Ringina is a monotypic genus of Australasian sheet weavers containing the single species, Ringina antarctica. It was first described by H. Tambs-Lyche in 1954, and has only been found on the Crozet Islands.
