= Thyreobaeus =

Scientific classification
- Kingdom: Animalia
- Phylum: Arthropoda
- Subphylum: Chelicerata
- Class: Arachnida
- Order: Araneae
- Infraorder: Araneomorphae
- Family: Linyphiidae
- Genus: Thyreobaeus; Simon, 1889
- Species: T. scutiger

Binomial name
- Thyreobaeus scutiger Simon, 1889

Genus of spiders

Thyreobaeus is a monotypic genus of East African sheet weavers containing the single species, Thyreobaeus scutiger. It was first described by Eugène Louis Simon in 1889, and has only been found on Madagascar.
