= Typhlonyphia =

Scientific classification
- Kingdom: Animalia
- Phylum: Arthropoda
- Subphylum: Chelicerata
- Class: Arachnida
- Order: Araneae
- Infraorder: Araneomorphae
- Family: Linyphiidae
- Genus: Typhlonyphia; Kratochvíl, 1936
- Species: T. reimoseri

Binomial name
- Typhlonyphia reimoseri Kratochvíl, 1936

Subspecies
- T. reimoseri reimoseri Kratochvíl, 1936 – Eastern Europe; T. reimoseri meridionalis Kratochvíl, 1978 – Croatia

Genus of spiders

Typhlonyphia is a monotypic genus of European sheet weavers containing the single species, Typhlonyphia reimoseri. It was first described by J. Kratochvíl in 1936, and is only found in Europe.
