= Singatrichona =

Scientific classification
- Kingdom: Animalia
- Phylum: Arthropoda
- Subphylum: Chelicerata
- Class: Arachnida
- Order: Araneae
- Infraorder: Araneomorphae
- Family: Linyphiidae
- Genus: Singatrichona; Tanasevitch, 2019
- Species: S. longipes

Binomial name
- Singatrichona longipes Tanasevitch, 2019

Genus of spiders

Singatrichona is a monotypic genus of southeast Asian sheet weavers containing the single species, Singatrichona longipes. It was first described by A. V. Tanasevitch in 2019, and it has only been found in Singapore.
