= Tmeticodes =

Scientific classification
- Kingdom: Animalia
- Phylum: Arthropoda
- Subphylum: Chelicerata
- Class: Arachnida
- Order: Araneae
- Infraorder: Araneomorphae
- Family: Linyphiidae
- Genus: Tmeticodes; Ono, 2010
- Species: T. gibbifer

Binomial name
- Tmeticodes gibbifer Ono, 2010

Genus of spiders

Tmeticodes is a monotypic genus of Japanese sheet weavers containing the single species, Tmeticodes gibbifer. It was first described by H. Ono in 2010, and is only found in Japan.
