= Walckenaerianus =

Scientific classification
- Kingdom: Animalia
- Phylum: Arthropoda
- Subphylum: Chelicerata
- Class: Arachnida
- Order: Araneae
- Infraorder: Araneomorphae
- Family: Linyphiidae
- Genus: Walckenaerianus; Wunderlich, 1995

Type species
- W. aimakensis Wunderlich, 1995

Species
- 2, see text

Genus of spiders

Walckenaerianus is a genus of sheet weavers that was first described by J. Wunderlich in 1995.

== Species ==
As of June 2019 it contains only two species:

- Walckenaerianus aimakensis Wunderlich, 1995 – Russia, Mongolia
- Walckenaerianus esyunini Tanasevitch, 2004 – Bulgaria, Russia, Kazakhstan
