= Sengletus =

Scientific classification
- Kingdom: Animalia
- Phylum: Arthropoda
- Subphylum: Chelicerata
- Class: Arachnida
- Order: Araneae
- Infraorder: Araneomorphae
- Family: Linyphiidae
- Genus: Sengletus; Tanasevitch, 2008

Type species
- S. extricatus (O. Pickard-Cambridge, 1876)

Species
- S. extricatus (O. Pickard-Cambridge, 1876) – Egypt, Israel, Iran; S. latus Tanasevitch, 2009 – Iran

Genus of spiders

Sengletus is a genus of Asian sheet weavers that was first described by A. V. Tanasevitch in 2008. As of May 2019 it contains only two species, both found in Iran, Israel, and Egypt: S. extricatus and S. latus.
