= Toltecaria =

Scientific classification
- Kingdom: Animalia
- Phylum: Arthropoda
- Subphylum: Chelicerata
- Class: Arachnida
- Order: Araneae
- Infraorder: Araneomorphae
- Family: Linyphiidae
- Genus: Toltecaria; Miller, 2007
- Species: T. antricola

Binomial name
- Toltecaria antricola (Millidge, 1984)

Genus of spiders

Toltecaria is a monotypic genus of Mexican sheet weavers containing the single species, Toltecaria antricola. It was first described by J. A. Miller in 2007, and is only found in Mexico.
