= Sisis =

Scientific classification
- Kingdom: Animalia
- Phylum: Arthropoda
- Subphylum: Chelicerata
- Class: Arachnida
- Order: Araneae
- Infraorder: Araneomorphae
- Family: Linyphiidae
- Genus: Sisis; Bishop & Crosby, 1938

Type species
- S. rotundus (Emerton, 1925)

Species
- S. plesius (Chamberlin, 1949) – USA; S. rotundus (Emerton, 1925) – USA, Canada

Genus of spiders

Sisis is a genus of North American sheet weavers that was first described by S. C. Bishop & C. R. Crosby in 1938. As of May 2019 it contains only two species, both found in Canada and the United States: S. plesius and S. rotundus.
