= Tarsiphantes =

Scientific classification
- Kingdom: Animalia
- Phylum: Arthropoda
- Subphylum: Chelicerata
- Class: Arachnida
- Order: Araneae
- Infraorder: Araneomorphae
- Family: Linyphiidae
- Genus: Tarsiphantes; Strand, 1905
- Species: T. latithorax

Binomial name
- Tarsiphantes latithorax Strand, 1905

Synonyms
- Pannicularia Tanasevitch, 1983

Genus of spiders

Tarsiphantes is a monotypic genus of sheet weavers containing the single species, Tarsiphantes latithorax. It was first described by Embrik Strand in 1905, and has only been found in Europe, Canada, Russia, on the Greenland, and in Siberia.
