= Strongyliceps =

Scientific classification
- Kingdom: Animalia
- Phylum: Arthropoda
- Subphylum: Chelicerata
- Class: Arachnida
- Order: Araneae
- Infraorder: Araneomorphae
- Family: Linyphiidae
- Genus: Strongyliceps; Fage, 1936

Type species
- S. alluaudi Fage, 1936

Species
- S. alluaudi Fage, 1936 – Kenya; S. anderseni Holm, 1962 – Kenya, Uganda

Genus of spiders

Strongyliceps is a genus of East African sheet weavers that was first described by L. Fage & Eugène Louis Simon in 1936. As of May 2019 it contains only two species, both found in Uganda and Kenya: S. alluaudi and S. anderseni.
