= Tessamoro =

Scientific classification
- Kingdom: Animalia
- Phylum: Arthropoda
- Subphylum: Chelicerata
- Class: Arachnida
- Order: Araneae
- Infraorder: Araneomorphae
- Family: Linyphiidae
- Genus: Tessamoro; Eskov, 1993
- Species: T. pallidus

Binomial name
- Tessamoro pallidus Eskov, 1993

Genus of spiders

Tessamoro is a monotypic genus of sheet weavers containing the single species, Tessamoro pallidus. It was first described by K. Y. Eskov in 1993, and has only been found in Russia.
