= Tibioplus =

Scientific classification
- Kingdom: Animalia
- Phylum: Arthropoda
- Subphylum: Chelicerata
- Class: Arachnida
- Order: Araneae
- Infraorder: Araneomorphae
- Family: Linyphiidae
- Genus: Tibioplus; Chamberlin & Ivie, 1947

Type species
- T. diversus (L. Koch, 1879)

Species
- 2, see text

Genus of spiders

Tibioplus is a genus of sheet weavers that was first described by Ralph Vary Chamberlin & Vaine Wilton Ivie in 1947.

== Species ==
As of June 2019 it contains only two species.

- Tibioplus diversus (L. Koch, 1879) – Scandinavia, Russia, Mongolia, USA (Alaska)
- Tibioplus tachygynoidesTanasevitch, 1989 – Kyrgyzstan
