= Russocampus =

Scientific classification
- Kingdom: Animalia
- Phylum: Arthropoda
- Subphylum: Chelicerata
- Class: Arachnida
- Order: Araneae
- Infraorder: Araneomorphae
- Family: Linyphiidae
- Genus: Russocampus; Tanasevitch, 2004
- Species: R. polchaninovae

Binomial name
- Russocampus polchaninovae Tanasevitch, 2004

Genus of spiders

Russocampus is a monotypic genus of Asian sheet weavers containing the single species, Russocampus polchaninovae. It was first described by A. V. Tanasevitch in 2004, and has only been found in Russia.
