= Ussurigone =

Scientific classification
- Kingdom: Animalia
- Phylum: Arthropoda
- Subphylum: Chelicerata
- Class: Arachnida
- Order: Araneae
- Infraorder: Araneomorphae
- Family: Linyphiidae
- Genus: Ussurigone; Eskov, 1993
- Species: U. melanocephala

Binomial name
- Ussurigone melanocephala Eskov, 1993

Genus of spiders

Ussurigone is a monotypic genus of Russian sheet weavers containing the single species, Ussurigone melanocephala. It was first described by K. Y. Eskov in 1993, and is only found in Russia.
