= Sinolinyphia =

Scientific classification
- Kingdom: Animalia
- Phylum: Arthropoda
- Subphylum: Chelicerata
- Class: Arachnida
- Order: Araneae
- Infraorder: Araneomorphae
- Family: Linyphiidae
- Genus: Sinolinyphia; Wunderlich & Li, 1995
- Species: S. henanensis

Binomial name
- Sinolinyphia henanensis (Hu, Wang & Wang, 1991)

Genus of spiders

Sinolinyphia is a monotypic genus of East Asian sheet weavers containing the single species, Sinolinyphia henanensis. It was first described by J. Wunderlich & S. Q. Li in 1995, and has only been found in China.
