= Stictonanus =

Scientific classification
- Kingdom: Animalia
- Phylum: Arthropoda
- Subphylum: Chelicerata
- Class: Arachnida
- Order: Araneae
- Infraorder: Araneomorphae
- Family: Linyphiidae
- Genus: Stictonanus; Millidge, 1991

Type species
- S. paucus Millidge, 1991

Species
- S. exiguus Millidge, 1991 – Chile; S. paucus Millidge, 1991 – Chile

Genus of spiders

Stictonanus is a genus of South American sheet weavers that was first described by Alfred Frank Millidge in 1991. As of May 2019 it contains only two species, both found in Chile: S. exiguus and S. paucus.
