= Trichobactrus =

Scientific classification
- Kingdom: Animalia
- Phylum: Arthropoda
- Subphylum: Chelicerata
- Class: Arachnida
- Order: Araneae
- Infraorder: Araneomorphae
- Family: Linyphiidae
- Genus: Trichobactrus; Wunderlich, 1995
- Species: T. brevispinosus

Binomial name
- Trichobactrus brevispinosus Wunderlich, 1995

Genus of spiders

Trichobactrus is a monotypic genus of Mongolian sheet weavers containing the single species, Trichobactrus brevispinosus. It was first described by J. Wunderlich in 1995, and is only found in Mongolia.
