= Viktorium =

Scientific classification
- Kingdom: Animalia
- Phylum: Arthropoda
- Subphylum: Chelicerata
- Class: Arachnida
- Order: Araneae
- Infraorder: Araneomorphae
- Family: Linyphiidae
- Genus: Viktorium; Eskov, 1988
- Species: V. putoranicum

Binomial name
- Viktorium putoranicum Eskov, 1988

Genus of spiders

Viktorium is a monotypic genus of Russian sheet weavers containing the single species, Viktorium putoranicum. It was first described by K. Y. Eskov in 1988, and is only found in Russia.
