= Scirites =

Scientific classification
- Kingdom: Animalia
- Phylum: Arthropoda
- Subphylum: Chelicerata
- Class: Arachnida
- Order: Araneae
- Infraorder: Araneomorphae
- Family: Linyphiidae
- Genus: Scirites; Bishop & Crosby, 1938

Type species
- S. pectinatus (Emerton, 1911)

Species
- S. finitimus Dupérré & Paquin, 2007 – USA, Canada; S. pectinatus (Emerton, 1911) – USA, Canada

Genus of spiders

Scirites is a genus of North American sheet weavers that was first described by S. C. Bishop & C. R. Crosby in 1938. As of May 2019 it contains only two species: S. finitimus and S. pectinatus.
