= Tubercithorax =

Scientific classification
- Kingdom: Animalia
- Phylum: Arthropoda
- Subphylum: Chelicerata
- Class: Arachnida
- Order: Araneae
- Infraorder: Araneomorphae
- Family: Linyphiidae
- Genus: Tubercithorax; Eskov, 1988

Type species
- T. furcifer Eskov, 1988

Species
- 2, see text

Genus of spiders

Tubercithorax is a genus of sheet weavers that was first described by K. Y. Eskov in 1988.

== Species ==
As of June 2019 it contains only two species.

- Tubercithorax furcifer Eskov, 1988 – Russia
- Tubercithorax subarcticus (Tanasevitch, 1984) – Russia (Europe, Siberia)
