= Uralophantes =

Scientific classification
- Kingdom: Animalia
- Phylum: Arthropoda
- Subphylum: Chelicerata
- Class: Arachnida
- Order: Araneae
- Infraorder: Araneomorphae
- Family: Linyphiidae
- Genus: Uralophantes; Esyunin, 1992
- Species: U. troitskensis

Binomial name
- Uralophantes troitskensis Esyunin, 1992

Genus of spiders

Uralophantes is a monotypic genus of European sheet weavers containing the single species, Uralophantes troitskensis. It was first described by S. L. Esyunin in 1992, and is only found in Europe.
