= Smermisia =

Scientific classification
- Kingdom: Animalia
- Phylum: Arthropoda
- Subphylum: Chelicerata
- Class: Arachnida
- Order: Araneae
- Infraorder: Araneomorphae
- Family: Linyphiidae
- Genus: Smermisia; Simon, 1894

Type species
- S. caracasana Simon, 1894

Species
- 5, see text

Genus of spiders

Smermisia is a genus of sheet weavers that was first described by Eugène Louis Simon in 1894.

== Species ==
As of May 2019 it contains five species, found in Argentina, Brazil, Costa Rica, Chile, and Venezuela:

- Smermisia caracasana Simon, 1894 (type) – Venezuela
- Smermisia esperanzae (Tullgren, 1901) – Chile
- Smermisia holdridgi Miller, 2007 – Costa Rica
- Smermisia parvoris Miller, 2007 – Brazil, Argentina
- Smermisia vicosana (Bishop & Crosby, 1938) – Brazil, Argentina
