= Thaiphantes =

Scientific classification
- Kingdom: Animalia
- Phylum: Arthropoda
- Subphylum: Chelicerata
- Class: Arachnida
- Order: Araneae
- Infraorder: Araneomorphae
- Family: Linyphiidae
- Genus: Thaiphantes; Millidge, 1995

Type species
- T. milneri Millidge, 1995

Species
- T. milneri Millidge, 1995 – Thailand; T. similis Millidge, 1995 – Thailand

Genus of spiders

Thaiphantes is a genus of Southeast Asian sheet weavers that was first described by Alfred Frank Millidge in 1995. As of May 2019 it contains only two species, both found in Thailand: T. milneri and T. similis.
