= Uusitaloia =

Scientific classification
- Kingdom: Animalia
- Phylum: Arthropoda
- Subphylum: Chelicerata
- Class: Arachnida
- Order: Araneae
- Infraorder: Araneomorphae
- Family: Linyphiidae
- Genus: Uusitaloia; Marusik, Koponen & Danilov, 2001

Type species
- U. transbaicalica Marusik, Koponen & Danilov, 2001

Species
- 2, see text

Genus of spiders

Uusitaloia is a genus of Russian sheet weavers that was first described by Y. M. Marusik, S. Koponen & S. N. Danilov in 2001.

== Species ==
As of June 2019 it contains only two species:

- Uusitaloia transbaicalica Marusik, Koponen & Danilov, 2001 – Russia
- Uusitaloia wrangeliana Marusik & Koponen, 2009 – Russia
