= Scironis =

Scientific classification
- Kingdom: Animalia
- Phylum: Arthropoda
- Subphylum: Chelicerata
- Class: Arachnida
- Order: Araneae
- Infraorder: Araneomorphae
- Family: Linyphiidae
- Genus: Scironis; Bishop & Crosby, 1938

Type species
- S. tarsalis (Emerton, 1911)

Species
- S. sima Chamberlin, 1949 – USA; S. tarsalis (Emerton, 1911) – USA

Genus of spiders

Scironis is a genus of North American sheet weavers that was first described by S. C. Bishop & C. R. Crosby in 1938. As of May 2019 it contains only two species, both found in the United States: S. sima and S. tarsalis.
