= Turbinellina =

Scientific classification
- Kingdom: Animalia
- Phylum: Arthropoda
- Subphylum: Chelicerata
- Class: Arachnida
- Order: Araneae
- Infraorder: Araneomorphae
- Family: Linyphiidae
- Genus: Turbinellina; Millidge, 1993
- Species: T. nigra

Binomial name
- Turbinellina nigra (Millidge, 1991)

Genus of spiders

Turbinellina is a monotypic genus of South American sheet weavers containing the single species, Turbinellina nigra. It was first described by Norman I. Platnick in 1993, and is only found in Argentina and Chile.
