= Racata =

Scientific classification
- Kingdom: Animalia
- Phylum: Arthropoda
- Subphylum: Chelicerata
- Class: Arachnida
- Order: Araneae
- Infraorder: Araneomorphae
- Family: Linyphiidae
- Genus: Racata; Millidge, 1995

Type species
- R. grata Millidge, 1995

Species
- 4, see text

Genus of spiders

Racata is a genus of Southeast Asian sheet weavers that was first described by Alfred Frank Millidge in 1995.

== Species ==
As of May 2019 it contains four species, found in Asia:

- Racata brevis Tanasevitch, 2019 – Indonesia (Sumatra)
- Racata grata Millidge, 1995 (type) – Indonesia (Krakatau, Java, Belitung)
- Racata laxa Tanasevitch, 2019 – Thailand, Indonesia (Sumatra)
- Racata sumatera Tanasevitch, 2019 – Indonesia (Sumatra)
