= Zhezhoulinyphia =

Scientific classification
- Kingdom: Animalia
- Phylum: Arthropoda
- Subphylum: Chelicerata
- Class: Arachnida
- Order: Araneae
- Infraorder: Araneomorphae
- Family: Linyphiidae
- Genus: Zhezhoulinyphia; Irfan, Zhou & Peng, 2019

Type species
- Z. denticulata Irfan, Zhou & Peng, 2019

Species
- Zhezhoulinyphia caperata Irfan, Zhou & Peng, 2019; Zhezhoulinyphia denticulata Irfan, Zhou & Peng, 2019; Zhezhoulinyphia yadongensis (Hu & Li, 1987)

Genus of spiders

Zhezhoulinyphia is a genus of east Asian sheet weavers. It was first described by M. Irfan, G. C. Zhou and X. J. Peng in 2019, and it has only been found in China. As of December 2021 it contains only three species: Z. caperata, Z. denticulata, and Z. yadongensis.

== See also ==
- Centromerus
