= Scotargus =

Scientific classification
- Kingdom: Animalia
- Phylum: Arthropoda
- Subphylum: Chelicerata
- Class: Arachnida
- Order: Araneae
- Infraorder: Araneomorphae
- Family: Linyphiidae
- Genus: Scotargus; Simon, 1913

Type species
- S. pilosus Simon, 1913

Species
- 6, see text

Genus of spiders

Scotargus is a genus of sheet weavers that was first described by Eugène Louis Simon in 1913.

== Species ==
As of May 2019 it contains six species, found in Europe, Algeria, North Africa, and on the Canary Islands:

- Scotargus enghoffi Wunderlich, 1992 – Canary Is.
- Scotargus grancanariensis Wunderlich, 1992 – Canary Is.
- Scotargus numidicus Bosmans, 2006 – Algeria
- Scotargus pilosus Simon, 1913 (type) – Europe, North Africa, Caucasus, Russia to Central Asia
- Scotargus secundus Wunderlich, 1987 – Canary Is.
- Scotargus tenerifensis Wunderlich, 1992 – Canary Is.
