= Selenyphantes =

Selenyphantes Temporal range: Neogene– Present

Scientific classification
- Kingdom: Animalia
- Phylum: Arthropoda
- Subphylum: Chelicerata
- Class: Arachnida
- Order: Araneae
- Infraorder: Araneomorphae
- Family: Linyphiidae
- Genus: Selenyphantes; Gertsch & Davis, 1946

Type species
- Selenyphantes longispinosus (O. Pickard-Cambridge, 1896)

Species
- 6, see text

Synonyms
- Palaeolinyphia Wunderlich, 1986

Genus of spiders

Selenyphantes is a genus of sheet weavers. It was first described by Willis J. Gertsch & L. I. Davis in 1946.

== Species ==
As of August 2021 it contains six species, found in Costa Rica, Mexico and Guatemala.

- Selenyphantes costaricensis Silva-Moreira & Hormiga, 2021 – Costa Rica
- Selenyphantes gaimani Silva-Moreira & Hormiga, 2021 – Mexico
- Selenyphantes iztactepetl Silva-Moreira & Hormiga, 2021 – Mexico
- Selenyphantes longispinosus (O. Pickard-Cambridge, 1896) (type) – Mexico
- Selenyphantes orizabae Silva-Moreira & Hormiga, 2021 – Mexico, Guatemala
- Selenyphantes volcanicus Silva-Moreira & Hormiga, 2021 – Mexico
