= Savigniorrhipis =

Scientific classification
- Kingdom: Animalia
- Phylum: Arthropoda
- Subphylum: Chelicerata
- Class: Arachnida
- Order: Araneae
- Infraorder: Araneomorphae
- Family: Linyphiidae
- Genus: Savigniorrhipis; Wunderlich, 1992

Type species
- S. acoreensis Wunderlich, 1992

Species
- S. acoreensis Wunderlich, 1992 – Azores; S. topographicus Crespo, 2013 – Azores

Genus of spiders

Savigniorrhipis is a genus of Portuguese sheet weavers that was first described by J. Wunderlich in 1992. As of May 2019 it contains only two species, both found on the Azores: S. acoreensis and S. topographicus.
