= Typhochrestinus =

Scientific classification
- Kingdom: Animalia
- Phylum: Arthropoda
- Subphylum: Chelicerata
- Class: Arachnida
- Order: Araneae
- Infraorder: Araneomorphae
- Family: Linyphiidae
- Genus: Typhochrestinus; Eskov, 1990
- Species: T. titulifer

Binomial name
- Typhochrestinus titulifer Eskov, 1990

Genus of spiders

Typhochrestinus is a monotypic genus of Russian sheet weavers containing the single species, Typhochrestinus titulifer. It was first described by K. Y. Eskov in 1990, and is only found in Russia.
