= Tapinocyboides =

Scientific classification
- Kingdom: Animalia
- Phylum: Arthropoda
- Subphylum: Chelicerata
- Class: Arachnida
- Order: Araneae
- Infraorder: Araneomorphae
- Family: Linyphiidae
- Genus: Tapinocyboides; Wiehle, 1960

Type species
- T. pygmaeus (Menge, 1869)

Species
- T. bengalensis Tanasevitch, 2011 – India; T. pygmaeus (Menge, 1869) – Europe

Genus of spiders

Tapinocyboides is a genus of sheet weavers that was first described by H. Wiehle in 1960. As of May 2019 it contains only two species, both found in Europe and India: T. bengalensis and T. pygmaeus.
