= Tybaertiella =

Scientific classification
- Kingdom: Animalia
- Phylum: Arthropoda
- Subphylum: Chelicerata
- Class: Arachnida
- Order: Araneae
- Infraorder: Araneomorphae
- Family: Linyphiidae
- Genus: Tybaertiella; Jocqué, 1979

Type species
- T. peniculifera Jocqué, 1979

Species
- 3, see text

Synonyms
- Locketia Holm, 1979

Genus of spiders

Tybaertiella is an African genus of sheet weavers that was first described by Rudy Jocqué in 1979.

== Species ==
As of October 2025, this genus includes three species:

- Tybaertiella convexa (Holm, 1962) – West, Central, East Africa
- Tybaertiella krugeri (Simon, 1894) – Africa
- Tybaertiella peniculifer Jocqué, 1979 – Ivory Coast, Nigeria, Ethiopia (type species)
