= Saitonia =

Scientific classification
- Kingdom: Animalia
- Phylum: Arthropoda
- Subphylum: Chelicerata
- Class: Arachnida
- Order: Araneae
- Infraorder: Araneomorphae
- Family: Linyphiidae
- Genus: Saitonia; Eskov, 1992

Type species
- S. muscus (Saito, 1989)

Species
- 6, see text

Genus of spiders

Saitonia is a genus of Asian sheet weavers that was first described by K. Y. Eskov in 1992.

== Species ==
As of May 2019 it contains six species, found in Korea, Japan, and China:

- Saitonia kawaguchikonis Saito & Ono, 2001 – China, Japan
- Saitonia longicephala (Saito, 1988) – Japan
- Saitonia muscus (Saito, 1989) (type) – Japan
- Saitonia ojiroensis (Saito, 1990) – Japan
- Saitonia orientalis (Oi, 1960) – Japan
- Saitonia pilosus Seo, 2011 – Korea
