= Thapsagus =

Scientific classification
- Kingdom: Animalia
- Phylum: Arthropoda
- Subphylum: Chelicerata
- Class: Arachnida
- Order: Araneae
- Infraorder: Araneomorphae
- Family: Linyphiidae
- Genus: Thapsagus; Simon, 1894
- Species: T. pulcher

Binomial name
- Thapsagus pulcher Simon, 1894

Genus of spiders

Thapsagus is a monotypic genus of East African sheet weavers containing the single species, Thapsagus pulcher. It was first described by Eugène Louis Simon in 1894, and has only been found on Madagascar.
