= Smodix =

Scientific classification
- Kingdom: Animalia
- Phylum: Arthropoda
- Subphylum: Chelicerata
- Class: Arachnida
- Order: Araneae
- Infraorder: Araneomorphae
- Family: Linyphiidae
- Genus: Smodix; Bishop & Crosby, 1938
- Species: S. reticulata

Binomial name
- Smodix reticulata (Emerton, 1915)

Genus of spiders

Smodix is a monotypic genus of North American sheet weavers containing the single species, Smodix reticulata. It was first described by S. C. Bishop & C. R. Crosby in 1938, and has only been found in Canada and the United States.
