= Sisyrbe =

Scientific classification
- Kingdom: Animalia
- Phylum: Arthropoda
- Subphylum: Chelicerata
- Class: Arachnida
- Order: Araneae
- Infraorder: Araneomorphae
- Family: Linyphiidae
- Genus: Sisyrbe; Bishop & Crosby, 1938
- Species: S. rustica

Binomial name
- Sisyrbe rustica (Banks, 1892)

Genus of spiders

Sisyrbe is a monotypic genus of North American spiders in the family Linyphiidae containing the single species, Sisyrbe rustica. It was first described by S. C. Bishop and C. R. Crosby in 1938, and has only been found in the United States.
