= Triplogyna =

Scientific classification
- Kingdom: Animalia
- Phylum: Arthropoda
- Subphylum: Chelicerata
- Class: Arachnida
- Order: Araneae
- Infraorder: Araneomorphae
- Family: Linyphiidae
- Genus: Triplogyna; Millidge, 1991

Type species
- T. major Millidge, 1991

Species
- 2, see text

Synonyms
- Barycara Millidge, 1991

Genus of spiders

Triplogyna is a genus of South American sheet weavers that was first described by Alfred Frank Millidge in 1991.

== Species ==
As of June 2019 it contains only two species.

- Triplogyna ignitula (Keyserling, 1886) − Brazil, Argentina
- Triplogyna major Millidge, 1991 − Colombia
