= Schistogyna =

Scientific classification
- Kingdom: Animalia
- Phylum: Arthropoda
- Subphylum: Chelicerata
- Class: Arachnida
- Order: Araneae
- Infraorder: Araneomorphae
- Family: Linyphiidae
- Genus: Schistogyna; Millidge, 1991
- Species: S. arcana

Binomial name
- Schistogyna arcana Millidge, 1991

Genus of spiders

Schistogyna is a monotypic genus of South American spiders in the sheet weaver family Linyphiidae containing the single species, Schistogyna arcana. It was first described by Alfred Frank Millidge in 1991, and has only been found in Chile and on the Juan Fernández Islands.
