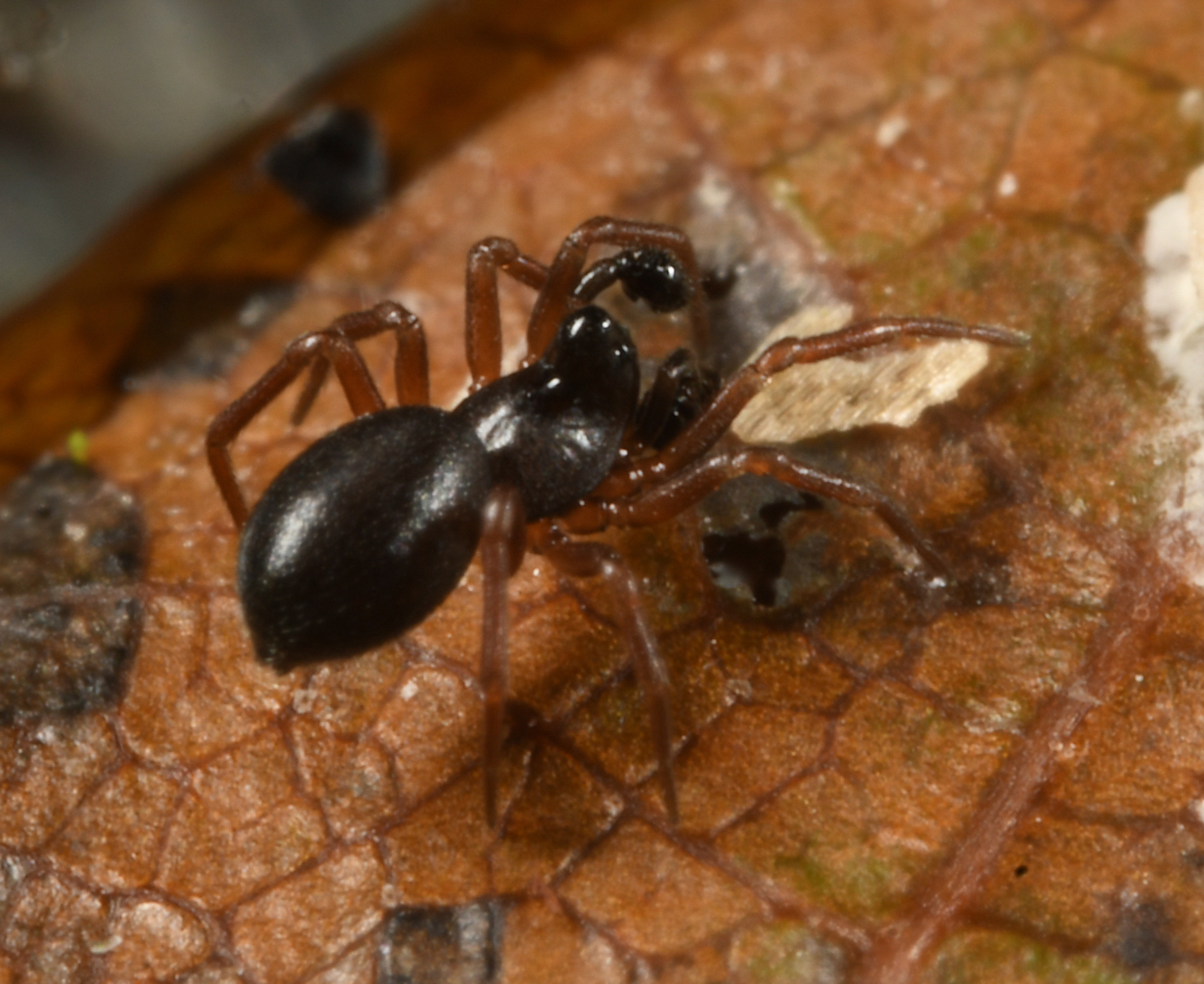
- male T. cito in France

Scientific classification
- Kingdom: Animalia
- Phylum: Arthropoda
- Subphylum: Chelicerata
- Class: Arachnida
- Order: Araneae
- Infraorder: Araneomorphae
- Family: Linyphiidae
- Genus: Trichopterna; Kulczyński, 1894

Type species
- T. cito (O. Pickard-Cambridge, 1873)

Species
- 9, see text

= Trichopterna =

Genus of spiders

Trichopterna is a genus of sheet weavers that was first described by C. Chyzer & Władysław Kulczyński in 1894.

== Species ==
As of June 2019 it contains nine species, found only in Africa, Asia, and Europe:

- Trichopterna cito (O. Pickard-Cambridge, 1873) (type) – Europe, Turkey, Caucasus, Russia (Europe to South Siberia), Kazakhstan
- Trichopterna cucurbitina (Simon, 1881) – Portugal, Spain, France
- Trichopterna grummi Tanasevitch, 1989 – Central Asia
- Trichopterna krueperi (Simon, 1885) – Greece
- Trichopterna loricata Denis, 1962 – Tanzania
- Trichopterna lucasi (O. Pickard-Cambridge, 1875) – Algeria
- Trichopterna macrophthalma Denis, 1962 – Tanzania
- Trichopterna rotundiceps Denis, 1962 – Tanzania
- Trichopterna seculifera Denis, 1962 – Tanzania
