= Subbekasha =

Scientific classification
- Kingdom: Animalia
- Phylum: Arthropoda
- Subphylum: Chelicerata
- Class: Arachnida
- Order: Araneae
- Infraorder: Araneomorphae
- Family: Linyphiidae
- Genus: Subbekasha; Millidge, 1984
- Species: S. flabellifera

Binomial name
- Subbekasha flabellifera Millidge, 1984

Genus of spiders

Subbekasha is a monotypic genus of North American sheet weavers containing the single species, Subbekasha flabellifera. It was first described by Alfred Frank Millidge in 1984, and has only been found in Canada.
