= Symmigma =

Scientific classification
- Kingdom: Animalia
- Phylum: Arthropoda
- Subphylum: Chelicerata
- Class: Arachnida
- Order: Araneae
- Infraorder: Araneomorphae
- Family: Linyphiidae
- Genus: Symmigma; Crosby & Bishop, 1933
- Species: S. minimum

Binomial name
- Symmigma minimum (Emerton, 1923)

Genus of spiders

Symmigma is a monotypic genus of North American sheet weavers containing the single species, Symmigma minimum. It was first described by C. R. Crosby & S. C. Bishop in 1933, and has only been found in the United States.
