= Scyletria =

Scientific classification
- Kingdom: Animalia
- Phylum: Arthropoda
- Subphylum: Chelicerata
- Class: Arachnida
- Order: Araneae
- Infraorder: Araneomorphae
- Family: Linyphiidae
- Genus: Scyletria; Bishop & Crosby, 1938
- Species: S. inflata

Binomial name
- Scyletria inflata Bishop & Crosby, 1938

Genus of spiders

Scyletria is a monotypic genus of North American sheet weavers containing the single species, Scyletria inflata. It was first described by S. C. Bishop & C. R. Crosby in 1938, and has only been found in Canada and the United States.
