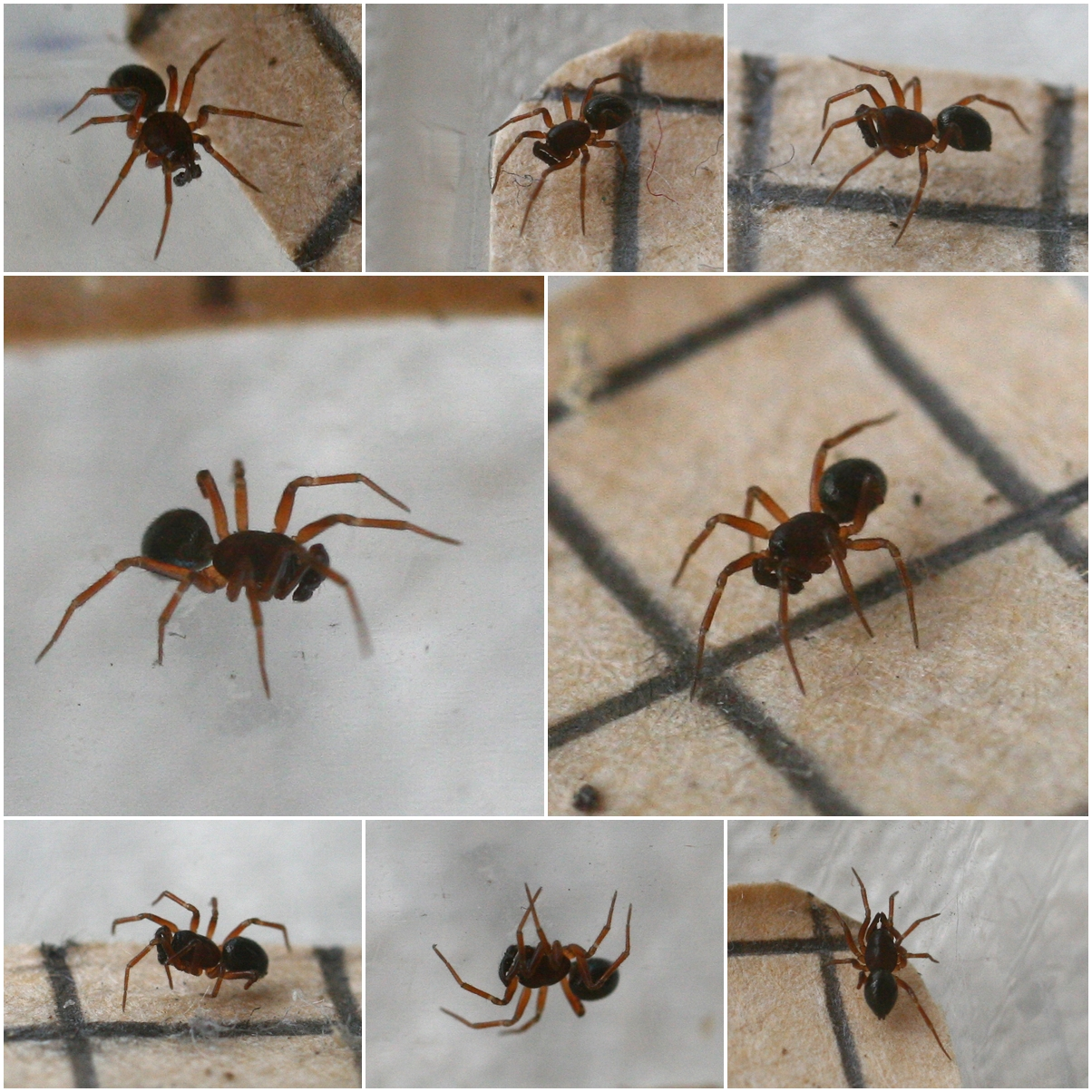
- T. vagans, male

Scientific classification
- Kingdom: Animalia
- Phylum: Arthropoda
- Subphylum: Chelicerata
- Class: Arachnida
- Order: Araneae
- Infraorder: Araneomorphae
- Family: Linyphiidae
- Genus: Tiso; Simon, 1884

Type species
- Tiso vagans (Blackwall, 1834)

Species
- 8, see text

= Tiso (spider) =

Genus of spiders

Tiso is a genus of sheet weavers first described by Eugène Simon in 1884.

== Species ==
As of 2017, it contains 8 species:

- Tiso aestivus (L. Koch, 1872) – Canada, Greenland, Europe, Russia (Europe to Far East), Nepal, Mongolia, Japan
- Tiso biceps Gao, Zhu & Gao, 1993 – China
- Tiso camillus Tanasevitch, 1990 – Azerbaijan
- Tiso golovatchi Tanasevitch, 2006 – Russia (Far East)
- Tiso incisus Tanasevitch, 2011 – India, Pakistan
- Tiso indianus Tanasevitch, 2011 – India, Nepal
- Tiso megalops Caporiacco, 1935 – Karakorum
- Tiso vagans (Blackwall, 1834) (type) – Madeira, Europe. Introduced to Canada
