= Trichoncoides =

Scientific classification
- Kingdom: Animalia
- Phylum: Arthropoda
- Subphylum: Chelicerata
- Class: Arachnida
- Order: Araneae
- Infraorder: Araneomorphae
- Family: Linyphiidae
- Genus: Trichoncoides; Denis, 1950

Type species
- T. pilosus Denis, 1950

Species
- 3, see text

Synonyms
- Paratrichoncus Miller, 1966; Spaniophrys Denis, 1966

Genus of spiders

Trichoncoides is a genus of sheet weavers that was first described by J. Denis in 1950.

== Species ==
As of June 2019 it contains three species.

- Trichoncoides pilosus Denis, 1950 (type) − France
- Trichoncoides piscator (Simon, 1884) − Europe, North Africa, Turkey, Caucasus, Russia (Europe to South Siberia), Kazakhstan, Iran, Central Asia
- Trichoncoides striganovae Tanasevitch & Piterkina, 2012 − Russia (Europe), Kazakhstan
