= Tapinotorquis =

Scientific classification
- Kingdom: Animalia
- Phylum: Arthropoda
- Subphylum: Chelicerata
- Class: Arachnida
- Order: Araneae
- Infraorder: Araneomorphae
- Family: Linyphiidae
- Genus: Tapinotorquis; Dupérré & Paquin, 2007
- Species: T. yamaskensis

Binomial name
- Tapinotorquis yamaskensis Dupérré & Paquin, 2007

Genus of spiders

Tapinotorquis is a monotypic genus of North American sheet weavers containing the single species, Tapinotorquis yamaskensis. It was first described by N. Dupérré & P. Paquin in 2007, and has only been found in Canada and the United States.
