= Strandella =

Scientific classification
- Kingdom: Animalia
- Phylum: Arthropoda
- Subphylum: Chelicerata
- Class: Arachnida
- Order: Araneae
- Infraorder: Araneomorphae
- Family: Linyphiidae
- Genus: Strandella; Oi, 1960

Type species
- S. quadrimaculata (Uyemura, 1937)

Species
- 5, see text

Genus of spiders

Strandella is a genus of Asian sheet weavers that was first described by R. Oi in 1960.

== Species ==
As of May 2019 it contains five species, found in Korea, China, Japan, and Russia:

- Strandella fluctimaculata Saito, 1982 – Russia, Japan
- Strandella paranglampara Barrion, Barrion-Dupo & Heong, 2013 – China
- Strandella pargongensis (Paik, 1965) – Russia, China, Korea, Japan
- Strandella quadrimaculata (Uyemura, 1937) (type) – Japan
- Strandella yaginumai Saito, 1982 – Japan
