= Scolecura =

Scientific classification
- Kingdom: Animalia
- Phylum: Arthropoda
- Subphylum: Chelicerata
- Class: Arachnida
- Order: Araneae
- Infraorder: Araneomorphae
- Family: Linyphiidae
- Genus: Scolecura; Millidge, 1991

Type species
- S. cognata Millidge, 1991

Species
- 4, see text

Genus of spiders

Scolecura is a genus of South American sheet weavers that was first described by Alfred Frank Millidge in 1991.

== Species ==
As of May 2019 it contains four species, found in Argentina, Colombia, and Brazil:

- Scolecura cambara Rodrigues, 2005 – Brazil
- Scolecura cognata Millidge, 1991 (type) – Colombia
- Scolecura parilis Millidge, 1991 – Brazil, Argentina
- Scolecura propinqua Millidge, 1991 – Argentina
