= Sitalcas =

Scientific classification
- Kingdom: Animalia
- Phylum: Arthropoda
- Subphylum: Chelicerata
- Class: Arachnida
- Order: Araneae
- Infraorder: Araneomorphae
- Family: Linyphiidae
- Genus: Sitalcas; Bishop & Crosby, 1938
- Species: S. ruralis

Binomial name
- Sitalcas ruralis Bishop & Crosby, 1938

Genus of spiders

Sitalcas is a monotypic genus of North American sheet weavers containing the single species, Sitalcas ruralis. It was first described by S. C. Bishop & C. R. Crosby in 1938, and has only been found in the United States.
