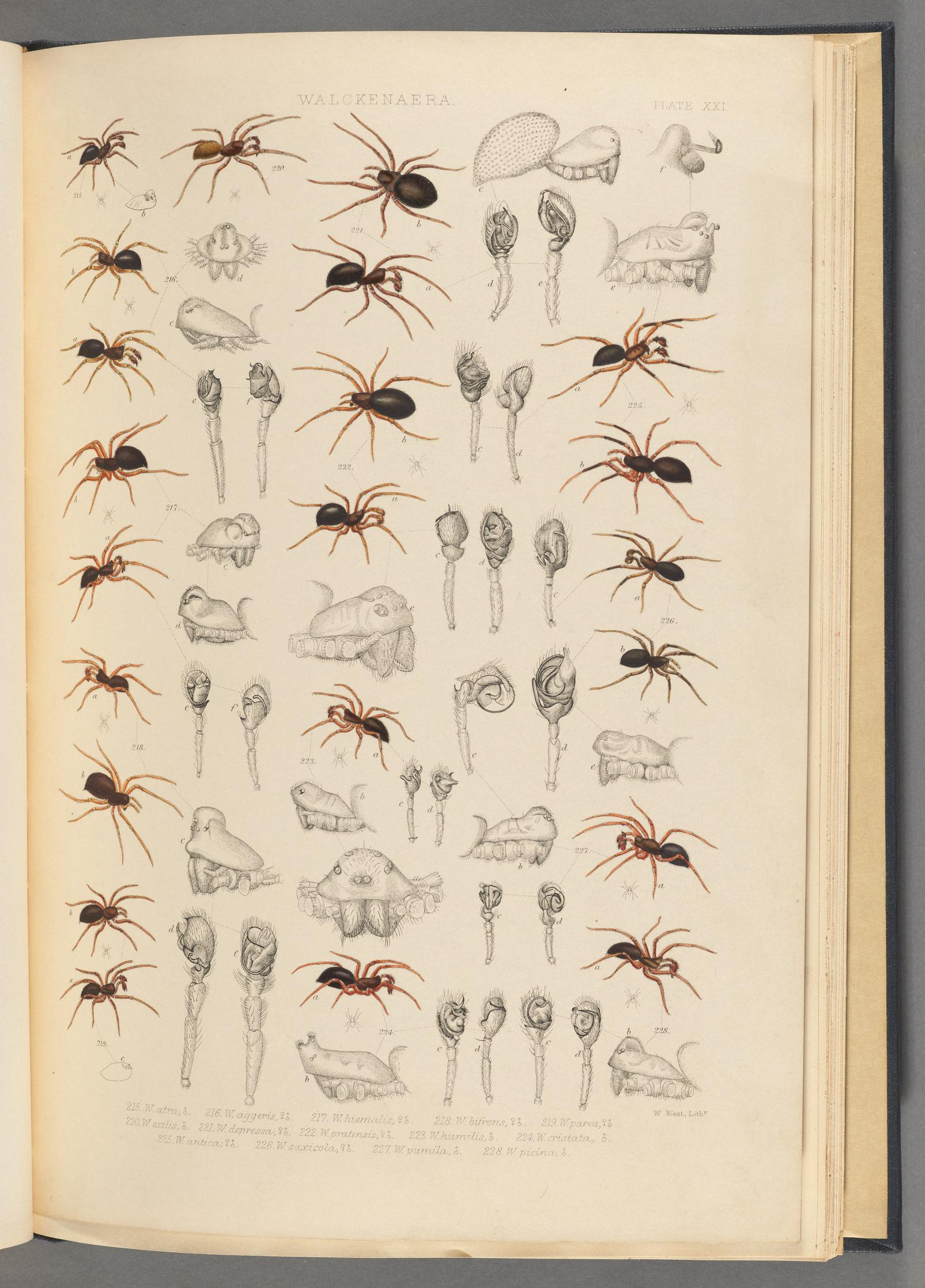
- Troxochrus scabriculus (figure 216)

Scientific classification
- Kingdom: Animalia
- Phylum: Arthropoda
- Subphylum: Chelicerata
- Class: Arachnida
- Order: Araneae
- Infraorder: Araneomorphae
- Family: Linyphiidae
- Genus: Troxochrus; Simon, 1884

Type species
- T. scabriculus (Westring, 1851)

Species
- 5, see text

= Troxochrus =

Genus of spiders

Troxochrus is a genus of sheet weavers that was first described by Eugène Louis Simon in 1884.

== Species ==
As of June 2019 it contains five species.

- Troxochrus apertus Tanasevitch, 2011 – Greece, Turkey
- Troxochrus laevithorax Miller, 1970 – Angola
- Troxochrus rugulosus (Westring, 1851) – Sweden
- Troxochrus scabriculus (Westring, 1851) (type) – Europe
- Troxochrus triangularis Tanasevitch, 2013 – Israel
