= Bulbophyllum sect. Monanthes =

- Bulbophyllum tortuosum

Scientific classification
- Kingdom: Plantae
- Clade: Tracheophytes
- Clade: Angiosperms
- Clade: Monocots
- Order: Asparagales
- Family: Orchidaceae
- Subfamily: Epidendroideae
- Genus: Bulbophyllum
- Section: Bulbophyllum sect. Monanthes (Blume) Aver. 1994

Type species
- Bulbophyllum tortuosum

Species
- See text

Synonyms
- Blepharochilum M.A.Clem. & D.L.Jones 2002; Canacorchis Guillaumin 1964; Diphyes Bl 1825; Bulbophyllum sect. Polyblepharon Schltr. 1912; Bulbophyllum sect. Hybochilus Schlechter 1912

Section of flowering plants

Bulbophyllum sect. Monanthes is a section of the genus Bulbophyllum.

== Description ==
Species in this section have a single flower with vein petals and a mobile lip.

== Distribution ==
Plants from this section are found from India, China to Australia.

== Species ==
Bulbophyllum section Monanthes comprises the following species:

Image	Name	Distribution	Elevation (m)
	Bulbophyllum aberrans Schltr. 1911	Nicobar Islands, Malaya, Borneo (Sabah), Sulawesi	
	Bulbophyllum ablepharon Schltr. 1923	Papua New Guinea	1,100 metres (3,600 ft)
	Bulbophyllum acutilobum J.J.Verm. & P.O'Byrne 2008	Sulawesi	1,000 metres (3,300 ft)
	Bulbophyllum adenoblepharon Schltr. 1913	New Guinea	200–250 metres (660–820 ft)
	Bulbophyllum amblyanthum Schltr. 1913	New Guinea	1,000 metres (3,300 ft)
	Bulbophyllum auritum J.J.Verm. & P.O'Byrne 2008	Sulawesi	1,700 metres (5,600 ft)
	Bulbophyllum bicaudatum Schltr. 1913	New Guinea	1,300 metres (4,300 ft)
	Bulbophyllum bisepalum Schltr. 1905	New Guinea	1,300 metres (4,300 ft)
	Bulbophyllum blepharocardium Schltr. 1913	New Guinea	800 metres (2,600 ft)
	Bulbophyllum cerambyx J.J.Sm. 1915	New Guinea	
	Bulbophyllum chalcochloron J.J.Verm. 2008	Papua New Guinea	
	Bulbophyllum chlorolirion J.J.Verm. 2008	Papua New Guinea	1,500–2,800 metres (4,900–9,200 ft)
	Bulbophyllum ciliolatum Schltr. 1913	New Guinea	
	Bulbophyllum citrellum Ridl. 1916	New Guinea	3,000 metres (9,800 ft)
	Bulbophyllum consimile J.J.Verm. & P.O'Byrne 2008	Sulawesi	1,600–2,200 metres (5,200–7,200 ft)
	Bulbophyllum crassulifolium (A. Cunn.) Rupp 1937	Australia (SE New South Wales to SE Queensland)	900–1,500 metres (3,000–4,900 ft)
	Bulbophyllum cryptanthoides J.J.Sm. 1912	New Guinea	700 metres (2,300 ft)
	Bulbophyllum cryptanthum Cogn. 1905	New Guinea	700–900 metres (2,300–3,000 ft)
	Bulbophyllum culex Ridl. 1916	western New Guinea	750 metres (2,460 ft)
	Bulbophyllum decumbens Schltr. 1913	New Guinea	700 metres (2,300 ft)
	Bulbophyllum decurrentilobum J.J.Verm. & P.O'Byrne 2003	Sulawesi	1,800–2,500 metres (5,900–8,200 ft)
	Bulbophyllum dichaeoides Schltr. 1913	New Guinea	
	Bulbophyllum dichilus Schltr. 1913	New Guinea	700–1,000 metres (2,300–3,300 ft)
	Bulbophyllum dischidiifolium J.J.Sm. 1909	Borneo, Sulawesi and New Guinea	400–1,200 metres (1,300–3,900 ft)
	Bulbophyllum dryadum Schltr. 1913	New Guinea	1,300 metres (4,300 ft)
	Bulbophyllum eciliatum Schltr. 1913	New Guinea	850–1,200 metres (2,790–3,940 ft)
	Bulbophyllum elegantius Schltr. 1913	New Guinea	1,200 metres (3,900 ft)
	Bulbophyllum endotrachys Schltr. 1913	New Guinea	800 metres (2,600 ft)
	Bulbophyllum erratum Ames 1922	Philippine (Leyte, Mindanao)	1,400 metres (4,600 ft)
	Bulbophyllum fibristectum J.J.Verm. 2008	Papua New Guinea	2,000 metres (6,600 ft)
	Bulbophyllum finisterrae Schltr. 1913	New Guinea	1,300 metres (4,300 ft)
	Bulbophyllum flexuosum Schltr. 1913	New Guinea	1,300 metres (4,300 ft)
	Bulbophyllum fuscatum Schltr. 1913	New Guinea	70–500 metres (230–1,640 ft)
	Bulbophyllum gautierense J.J.Sm. 1912	New Guinea	700 metres (2,300 ft)
	Bulbophyllum glabrum Schltr. 1913	New Guinea	400 metres (1,300 ft)
	Bulbophyllum heteroblepharon Schltr. 1913	New Guinea	200–300 metres (660–980 ft)
	Bulbophyllum hexurum Schltr. 1913	New Guinea	1,200 metres (3,900 ft)
	Bulbophyllum ignobile J.J.Sm. 1934	New Guinea	
	Bulbophyllum inauditum Schltr. 1913	New Guinea	1,400–1,800 metres (4,600–5,900 ft)
	Bulbophyllum incumbens Schltr. 1913	New Guinea	500 metres (1,600 ft)
	Bulbophyllum inversum Schltr. 1913	New Guinea	1,000 metres (3,300 ft)
	Bulbophyllum kenejianum Schltr. 1913	New Guinea	150–350 metres (490–1,150 ft)
	Bulbophyllum lancilabium Schltr. 1913	Philippines (Mindanao)	
	Bulbophyllum leptoflorum P.O'Byrne & P.T.Ong 2014	peninsular Malaysia	90 metres (300 ft)
	Bulbophyllum lichenoides Schltr. 1913	New Guinea	800 metres (2,600 ft)
	Bulbophyllum lineariflorum J.J.Sm. 1911	New Guinea	2,145 metres (7,037 ft)
	Bulbophyllum linearilabium J.J.Sm. 1912	Moluccas and New Guinea	200 metres (660 ft)
	Bulbophyllum lophoglottis (Guillaumin) N.Halle 1977	New Caledonia	1,200 metres (3,900 ft)
	Bulbophyllum loxophyllum Schltr. 1913	New Guinea	300–600 metres (980–1,970 ft)
	Bulbophyllum maboroense Schltr. 1913	New Guinea	1,000 metres (3,300 ft)
	Bulbophyllum macphersonii Rupp 1934	Australia (Queensland)	450–1,400 metres (1,480–4,590 ft)
	Bulbophyllum masarangicum Schltr. 1911	Sulawesi	1,200–1,600 metres (3,900–5,200 ft)
	Bulbophyllum masonii (Senghas) J.J.Wood 1986	Papua New Guinea	1,500–2,700 metres (4,900–8,900 ft)
	Bulbophyllum mattesii Sieder & Kiehn 2009	New Guinea	100 metres (330 ft)
	Bulbophyllum microblepharon Schltr. 1913	New Guinea	700 metres (2,300 ft)
	Bulbophyllum microdendron Schltr. 1913	New Guinea	1,300 metres (4,300 ft)
	Bulbophyllum microthamnus Schltr. 1923	Papua New Guinea	1,300 metres (4,300 ft)
	Bulbophyllum minutibulbum W.Kittr. 1984 publ. 1985	New Guinea	450 metres (1,480 ft)
	Bulbophyllum montanum Schltr. 1913	New Guinea	1,000 metres (3,300 ft)
	Bulbophyllum myolaense Garay, Hamer & Siegerist 1995	New Guinea	
	Bulbophyllum myrtillus Schltr. 1913	New Guinea	1,800–2,300 metres (5,900–7,500 ft)
	Bulbophyllum navicula Schltr. 1913	New Guinea	900 metres (3,000 ft)
	Bulbophyllum nigrilabium Schltr. 1913	New Guinea	150–200 metres (490–660 ft)
	Bulbophyllum nummularioides Schltr. 1913	New Guinea	300–800 metres (980–2,620 ft)
	Bulbophyllum obyrnei Garay, Hamer & Siegerist 1995	New Guinea	
	Bulbophyllum odontostigma J.J.Verm. 2008	Irian Jaya New Guinea	600 metres (2,000 ft)
	Bulbophyllum oligochaete Schltr. 1913	New Guinea	1,300 metres (4,300 ft)
	Bulbophyllum oncopus J.J.Verm. & P.O'Byrne 2008	Sulawesi	1,200–1,500 metres (3,900–4,900 ft)
	Bulbophyllum orohense J.J.Sm. 1915	New Guinea	1,400 metres (4,600 ft)
	Bulbophyllum pachyacris J.J.Sm. 1908	New Guinea	50 metres (160 ft)
	Bulbophyllum papuaense X.H.Jin 2020	New Guinea	1,700–1,900 metres (5,600–6,200 ft)
	Bulbophyllum perexiguum Ridl. 1916	New Guinea	759 metres (2,490 ft)
	Bulbophyllum plumula Schltr. 1913	New Guinea	700–1,000 metres (2,300–3,300 ft)
	Bulbophyllum polyblepharon Schltr. 1905	New Guinea	300–600 metres (980–1,970 ft)
	Bulbophyllum pseudoserrulatum J.J.Sm. 1912	New Guinea	30–300 metres (98–984 ft)
	Bulbophyllum ptilotes Schltr. 1913	New Guinea	1,000 metres (3,300 ft)
	Bulbophyllum ptychostigma J.J.Verm. 2008	Papua New Guinea	450 metres (1,480 ft)
	Bulbophyllum punamense Schltr. 1913	New Ireland, New Guinea	550 metres (1,800 ft)
	Bulbophyllum quadrifalciculatum J.J.Sm. 1929	New Guinea	1,420 metres (4,660 ft)
	Bulbophyllum quadrisubulatum J.J.Sm. 1929	New Guinea	
	Bulbophyllum quinquelobum Schltr.1913	New Guinea	800 metres (2,600 ft)
	Bulbophyllum rarum Schltr. 1913	New Guinea	900 metres (3,000 ft)
	Bulbophyllum recurviflorum J.J.Sm. 1903	Moluccas	
	Bulbophyllum renipetalum Schltr. 1913	New Guinea and Sulawesi	1,000–1,500 metres (3,300–4,900 ft)
	Bulbophyllum rhopaloblepharon Schltr. 1913	New Guinea	150 metres (490 ft)
	Bulbophyllum saccolabioides J.J.Sm. 1929	New Guinea	2,145–3,100 metres (7,037–10,171 ft)
	Bulbophyllum scintilla Ridl. 1908	Borneo (Sarawak)	
	Bulbophyllum scopula Schltr. 1913	New Guinea	1,100 metres (3,600 ft)
	Bulbophyllum serrulatifolium J.J.Sm. 1929	New Guinea	200 metres (660 ft)
	Bulbophyllum serrulatum Schltr. 1905	New Guinea	300–500 metres (980–1,640 ft)
	Bulbophyllum stemonochilum J.J.Verm. 2008	Irian Jaya New Guinea	1,900–2,100 metres (6,200–6,900 ft)
	Bulbophyllum stenochilum Schltr.1913	New Guinea and Solomon Islands	1,300 metres (4,300 ft)
	Bulbophyllum tentaculiferum Schltr. 1913	New Guinea	2,300 metres (7,500 ft)
	Bulbophyllum torquatum J.J.Sm. 1929	western New Guinea	1,420 metres (4,660 ft)
	Bulbophyllum tortuosum Lindl. [Bl.] 1830	eastern Himalayas, Bhutan, Myanmar, Thailand, Malaysia, Laos, Vietnam, Malaysia, Borneo, Java and Sumatra	200–2,000 metres (660–6,560 ft)
	Bulbophyllum trachybracteum Schltr. 1913	New Guinea	1,200 metres (3,900 ft)
	Bulbophyllum trichosalpinxoides Jenny & R.Amsler 2020	New Guinea	
	Bulbophyllum uncinatum J.J.Verm. & P.O'Byrne 2003	Sulawesi	500–1,000 metres (1,600–3,300 ft)
	Bulbophyllum unguilabium Schltr. 1913	New Guinea	1,000 metres (3,300 ft)
	Bulbophyllum unicaudatum Schltr.1913	New Guinea	1,000 metres (3,300 ft)
	Bulbophyllum uroglossum Schltr. 1921	Papua New Guinea	
	Bulbophyllum vaccinioides Schltr. 1913	New Guinea	1,300 metres (4,300 ft)
	Bulbophyllum verruculatum Schltr. 1913	New Guinea	1,200 metres (3,900 ft)
	Bulbophyllum vexillarium Ridl. 1916	New Guinea	750–3,350 metres (2,460–10,990 ft)
	Bulbophyllum vutimenaense B.A.Lewis 1994	Vanuatu	
	Bulbophyllum xanthornis Schuit. & de Vogel 2002	New Guinea	2,600–2,900 metres (8,500–9,500 ft)
	Bulbophyllum xanthotes Schltr. 1913	New Guinea	900 metres (3,000 ft)
