= Montanus (disambiguation) =

Montanus was the second-century founder of Montanism.

Montanus (Latin, 'mountain') may also refer to:

== People ==
- Lucius Venuleius Montanus Apronianus (1st century AD), Roman senator
- Alpinius Montanus (1st century AD), of the Treviri, a tribe of the Belgae, commander of a Roman cohort
- Arnoldus Montanus (c.1625–1683), Dutch teacher and author
- Benedictus Arias Montanus or Benito Arias Montano (1527–1598), Spanish orientalist
- Jan Simonides Montanus (c.1535-1587), Czech composer
- Johannes Baptista Montanus (1498–1551), Italian physician and medical writer
- Johannes Scultetus Montanus (1531-1604), Silesian Paracelsist
- Reginaldus Gonsalvius Montanus, pseudonym of Casiodoro de Reina (c.1520–1594), Spanish Lutheran theologian
- Saint Montanus, one of the Martyrs of Carthage under Valerian.

== Fictional characters ==
- Erasmus Montanus (1722), play by Ludvig Holberg and Latinised name of its lead character Rasmus Berg

== See also ==
- Montana (disambiguation)
- Montanum (disambiguation)

Frogs

- Alsodes montanus
- Astylosternus montanus
- Batrachylodes montanus
- Cophixalus montanus
- Eleutherodactylus montanus
- Hyperolius montanus
- Platymantis montanus

Other animals

- Adaina montanus, moth
- Aenetus montanus, moth
- Agapetus montanus, caddisfly
- Blennidus montanus, beetle
- Caelostomus montanus, beetle
- Chalcides montanus, skink
- Cybaeus montanus, spider
- Deretrachys montanus, beetle
- Eremias montanus, lizard
- Euscorpiops montanus, scorpion
- Hemicrepidius montanus, beetle
- Henricus montanus, moth
- Ilybius montanus, beetle
- Mirosternus montanus, beetle
- Monosyntaxis montanus, moth
- Orachrysops montanus, butterfly
- Orthogonius montanus, beetle
- Orthops montanus, plant bug
- Paradoxurus montanus, civet
- Porcellio montanus, woodlouse
- Scotinotylus montanus, sheet weaver (spider)
- Synuchus montanus, beetle
- Thestor montanus, butterfly
- Trochulus montanus, snail

Plants and fungi

- Acanthus montanus, or mountain thistle
- Anthodiscus montanus, family Caryocaraceae
- Callistemon montanus, or mountain bottlebrush
- Cercocarpus montanus, or mountain mahogany
- Goniothalamus montanus, family Annonaceae
- Lentinellus montanus, agaric fungus in the family Auriscalpiaceae
- Leptosiphon montanus, phlox family
- Oxyanthus montanus, family Rubiaceae
- Pandanus montanus, family Pandanaceae
- Phyllanthus montanus, family Euphorbiaceae
- Pseudaraeococcus montanus, family Bromeliaceae
- Tylopilus montanus, bolete fungus in the family Boletaceae
