= Montanum =

Montanum is the neuter form of a Latin word meaning mountain (as an adjective). It appears as the second element of species names as follows:

== Animals ==
- Altagonum montanum, ground beetle
- Aspidodiadema montanum, sea urchin
- Anthidium montanum, mason bee
- Labicymbium montanum, sheet weaver (spider)
- Leptobrachium montanum, amphibian
- Psycharium montanum, moth
- Rhagium montanum, beetle

== Plants ==
- Antidesma montanum, tree of the family Phyllanthaceae
- Arthrophyllum montanum, synonym of Polyscias montana, ivy family
- Asplenium montanum, fern, mountain spleenwort
- Baliospermum montanum, synonym of Baliospermum solanifolium, red physic nut
- Botrychium montanum, fern, mountain moonwort
- Bulbophyllum montanum, orchid
- Canistrum montanum, family Bromeliaceae
- Cypripedium montanum, orchid, mountain lady's slipper
- Epilobium montanum, broad-leaved willowherb
- Erythronium montanum, white avalanche lily
- Geum montanum, rose family
- Hypericum montanum, pale St. John's-wort
- Myoporum montanum, waterbush, Australian shrub
- Lepidium montanum, mountain pepperwort
- Sideroxylon montanum, family Sapotaceae
- Platylobium montanum, Australian shrub
- Sisyrinchium montanum, American blue-eyed grass
- Spathiphyllum montanum, arum family
- Symphionema montanum, Australian shrub
- Trifolium montanum, bean family
- Xanthophyllum montanum, tree of the family Polygalaceae
- Leptospermum polygalifolium subsp. montanum, mountain tea tree

== See also ==
- Montanus (disambiguation)
- Montana (disambiguation)
