= Scotinotylus formicarius =

Scientific classification
- Kingdom: Animalia
- Phylum: Arthropoda
- Subphylum: Chelicerata
- Class: Arachnida
- Order: Araneae
- Infraorder: Araneomorphae
- Family: Linyphiidae
- Genus: Scotinotylus
- Species: S. formicarius

Binomial name
- Scotinotylus formicarius (Dondale & Redner, 1972)

Species of spider

Scotinotylus formicarius is a species of sheet weaver found in the United States. It was first described by Dondale & Redner in 1972.
