= Deretrachys villiersi =

Scientific classification
- Domain: Eukaryota
- Kingdom: Animalia
- Phylum: Arthropoda
- Class: Insecta
- Order: Coleoptera
- Suborder: Polyphaga
- Infraorder: Cucujiformia
- Family: Cerambycidae
- Genus: Deretrachys
- Species: D. villiersi

Binomial name
- Deretrachys villiersi Huedepohl, 1985

Species of beetle

Deretrachys villiersi is a species of beetle in the family Cerambycidae. It was described by Huedepohl in 1985.
