= Scotinotylus sanctus =

Scientific classification
- Domain: Eukaryota
- Kingdom: Animalia
- Phylum: Arthropoda
- Subphylum: Chelicerata
- Class: Arachnida
- Order: Araneae
- Infraorder: Araneomorphae
- Family: Linyphiidae
- Genus: Scotinotylus
- Species: S. sanctus

Binomial name
- Scotinotylus sanctus (Crosby, 1929)

Species of spider

Scotinotylus sanctus is a species of sheet weaver found in Canada and the United States. It was described by Crosby in 1929.
