= Scotinotylus alpigena =

Scientific classification
- Domain: Eukaryota
- Kingdom: Animalia
- Phylum: Arthropoda
- Subphylum: Chelicerata
- Class: Arachnida
- Order: Araneae
- Infraorder: Araneomorphae
- Family: Linyphiidae
- Genus: Scotinotylus
- Species: S. alpigena

Binomial name
- Scotinotylus alpigena (L. Koch, 1869)

Species of spider

Scotinotylus alpigena is a species of sheet weaver found in the Palearctic. It was described by L. Koch in 1869.
