= Scotinotylus venetus =

Scientific classification
- Kingdom: Animalia
- Phylum: Arthropoda
- Subphylum: Chelicerata
- Class: Arachnida
- Order: Araneae
- Infraorder: Araneomorphae
- Family: Linyphiidae
- Genus: Scotinotylus
- Species: S. venetus

Binomial name
- Scotinotylus venetus (Thorell, 1875)

Species of spider

Scotinotylus venetus is a species of sheet weaver found in Italy. It was described by Thorell in 1875.
