= Scotinotylus apache =

Scientific classification
- Kingdom: Animalia
- Phylum: Arthropoda
- Subphylum: Chelicerata
- Class: Arachnida
- Order: Araneae
- Infraorder: Araneomorphae
- Family: Linyphiidae
- Genus: Scotinotylus
- Species: S. apache

Binomial name
- Scotinotylus apache (Chamberlin, 1949)

Species of spider

Scotinotylus apache is a species of sheet weaver found in the United States. It was described by Chamberlin in 1949.
