= Scotinotylus patellatus =

Scientific classification
- Domain: Eukaryota
- Kingdom: Animalia
- Phylum: Arthropoda
- Subphylum: Chelicerata
- Class: Arachnida
- Order: Araneae
- Infraorder: Araneomorphae
- Family: Linyphiidae
- Genus: Scotinotylus
- Species: S. patellatus

Binomial name
- Scotinotylus patellatus (Emerton, 1917)

Species of spider

Scotinotylus patellatus is a spider in the species of Linyphiidae or "sheet weaver" found in Canada and Alaska, United States. It was first described by Emerton a Canadian Entomologist in 1917. The Scotinotylus patellatus is also known as "A Dwarf Weaver".
