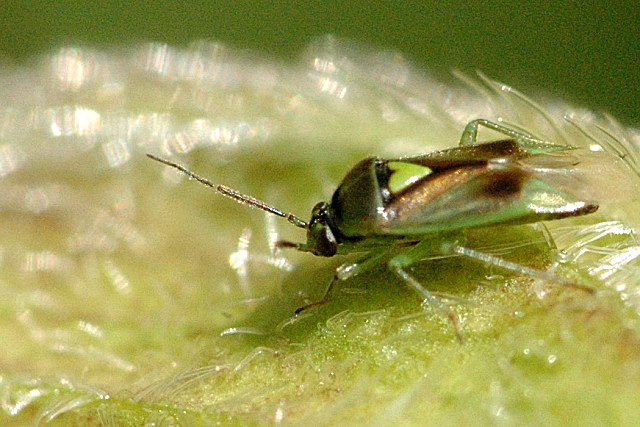

Scientific classification
- Kingdom: Animalia
- Phylum: Arthropoda
- Clade: Pancrustacea
- Class: Insecta
- Order: Hemiptera
- Suborder: Heteroptera
- Family: Miridae
- Genus: Orthops
- Species: O. campestris

Binomial name
- Orthops campestris (Linnaeus, 1758)

Synonyms
- Cimex campestris Linnaeus, 1758

= Orthops campestris =

Species of true bug

Orthops campestris is a species of plant bugs belonging to the family Miridae and subfamily Mirinae. It can be found everywhere in Europe except for Azores, Faroe Islands, Iceland and African islands such as Canary Islands, and Cyprus. It can also be found across the Palearctic to Central Asia and Siberia.

== Description and ecology ==
It is 4 millimetres (0.16 in) long with short antennae. They feed on wild parsnip, Angelica, Heracleum, Aegopodium, Daucus, Anthriscus, Pimpinella, Anethum, and in gardens on Levisticum officinale. Adults overwinter after which they mate in spring. The new generation starts in July.
