= Scotinotylus millidgei =

Scientific classification
- Domain: Eukaryota
- Kingdom: Animalia
- Phylum: Arthropoda
- Subphylum: Chelicerata
- Class: Arachnida
- Order: Araneae
- Infraorder: Araneomorphae
- Family: Linyphiidae
- Genus: Scotinotylus
- Species: S. millidgei

Binomial name
- Scotinotylus millidgei Eskov, 1989

Species of spider

Scotinotylus millidgei is a species of sheet weaver found in Russia. It was described by Eskov in 1989.
