= Scotinotylus vernalis =

Scientific classification
- Domain: Eukaryota
- Kingdom: Animalia
- Phylum: Arthropoda
- Subphylum: Chelicerata
- Class: Arachnida
- Order: Araneae
- Infraorder: Araneomorphae
- Family: Linyphiidae
- Genus: Scotinotylus
- Species: S. vernalis

Binomial name
- Scotinotylus vernalis (Emerton, 1882)

Species of spider

Scotinotylus vernalis is a species of sheet weaver found in Canada and the United States. It was described by Emerton in 1882.
