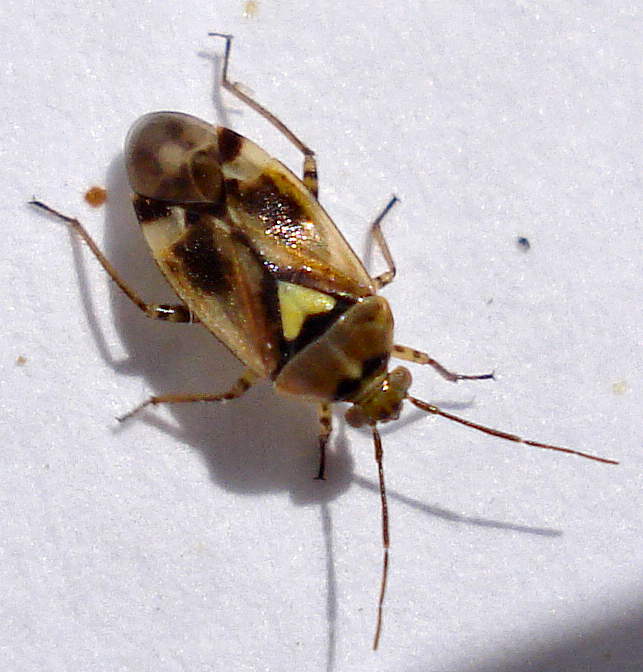

Scientific classification
- Kingdom: Animalia
- Phylum: Arthropoda
- Class: Insecta
- Order: Hemiptera
- Suborder: Heteroptera
- Family: Miridae
- Genus: Orthops
- Species: O. basalis

Binomial name
- Orthops basalis (A. Costa, 1853)

Synonyms
- Phytocoris basalis A. Costa, 1853

= Orthops basalis =

Species of true bug

Orthops basalis is a species of plant bug belonging to the family Miridae, subfamily Mirinae that can be found everywhere in Europe except for Azores, Bosnia and Herzegovina Faroe Islands, Iceland and Cyprus. then east across the Palearctic to Central Asia and Siberia.

== Description ==
It is 5 millimetres (0.20 in) long and is elongated with males often having three pale spots on the scutellum.

== Biology ==
Orthops basalis lives on various Apiaceae and have no specialization in certain genera. Both the nymphs and the adult bugs are often on the flowers, especially on the stems directly below the flowers. There they suck on the immature reproductive organs.
