= Scotinotylus amurensis =

Scientific classification
- Kingdom: Animalia
- Phylum: Arthropoda
- Subphylum: Chelicerata
- Class: Arachnida
- Order: Araneae
- Infraorder: Araneomorphae
- Family: Linyphiidae
- Genus: Scotinotylus
- Species: S. amurensis

Binomial name
- Scotinotylus amurensis Eskov & Marusik, 1994

Species of spider

Scotinotylus amurensis is a species of sheet weaver found in Russia. It was described by Eskov & Marusik in 1994.
