= Labicymbium rusticulum =

Scientific classification
- Domain: Eukaryota
- Kingdom: Animalia
- Phylum: Arthropoda
- Subphylum: Chelicerata
- Class: Arachnida
- Order: Araneae
- Infraorder: Araneomorphae
- Family: Linyphiidae
- Genus: Labicymbium
- Species: L. rusticulum

Binomial name
- Labicymbium rusticulum (Keyserling, 1891)

Species of spider

Labicymbium rusticulum is a species of sheet weaver found in Brazil. It was described by Keyserling in 1891.
