= Scotinotylus protervus =

Scientific classification
- Domain: Eukaryota
- Kingdom: Animalia
- Phylum: Arthropoda
- Subphylum: Chelicerata
- Class: Arachnida
- Order: Araneae
- Infraorder: Araneomorphae
- Family: Linyphiidae
- Genus: Scotinotylus
- Species: S. protervus

Binomial name
- Scotinotylus protervus (L. Koch, 1879)

Species of spider

Scotinotylus protervus is a species of sheet weaver found in Alaska, Canada, Kazakhstan, Mongolia and Russia. It was described by L. Koch in 1879.
