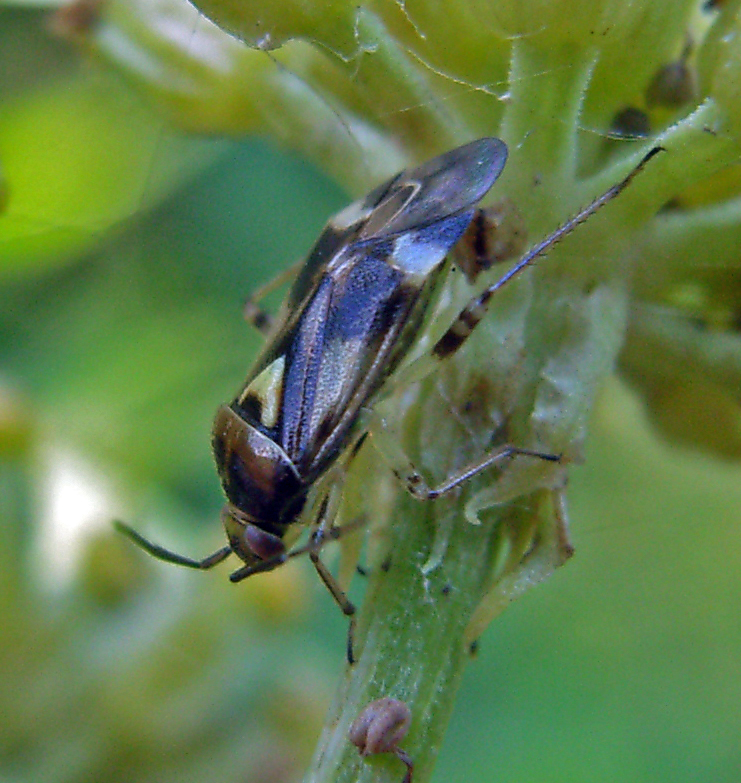

Scientific classification
- Kingdom: Animalia
- Phylum: Arthropoda
- Class: Insecta
- Order: Hemiptera
- Suborder: Heteroptera
- Family: Miridae
- Genus: Orthops
- Species: O. kalmii

Binomial name
- Orthops kalmii (Linnaeus, 1758)

Synonyms
- Cimex kalmii Linnaeus, 1758

= Orthops kalmii =

Species of true bug

Orthops kalmii, commonly known as kalm's plant bug, is a species of plant bug belonging to the family Miridae and subfamily Mirinae. It can be found everywhere in Europe with the exception of the islands Azores, the Canary Islands, Faroe Islands, Iceland and Malta. Then east through the Palearctic to Siberia. It is 4.5 millimetres (0.18 in) long. Both nymphs and adults feed on Apiaceae without preference. The name honours Finnish naturalist Pehr Kalm.
