= Scotinotylus =

Scientific classification
- Kingdom: Animalia
- Phylum: Arthropoda
- Subphylum: Chelicerata
- Class: Arachnida
- Order: Araneae
- Infraorder: Araneomorphae
- Family: Linyphiidae
- Genus: Scotinotylus; Simon, 1884

Type species
- S. antennatus (O. Pickard-Cambridge, 1875)

Species
- 47, see text

Synonyms
- Caledonia O. Pickard-Cambridge, 1894; Cervinargus Vogelsanger, 1944; Cheraira Chamberlin, 1949; Cochlembolus Crosby, 1929; Yukon Chamberlin & Ivie, 1947

Genus of spiders

Scotinotylus is a genus of sheet weavers that was first described by Eugène Louis Simon in 1884.

== Species ==
As of August 2021 it contains forty-seven species, found in Europe and Asia:

- Scotinotylus alienus (Kulczyński, 1885) – Russia, USA (Alaska), Canada
- Scotinotylus allocotus Crawford & Edwards, 1989 – USA
- Scotinotylus alpigena (L. Koch, 1869) – Europe, Russia to Central Asia
- Scotinotylus alpinus (Banks, 1896) – Russia, Mongolia, USA (Alaska), Canada, USA, Greenland
- Scotinotylus altaicus Marusik, Hippa & Koponen, 1996 – Russia
- Scotinotylus ambiguus Millidge, 1981 – USA, Canada
- Scotinotylus amurensis Eskov & Marusik, 1994 – Russia
- Scotinotylus antennatus (O. Pickard-Cambridge, 1875) (type) – Europe, Kazakhstan, Russia (South Siberia)
- Scotinotylus apache (Chamberlin, 1949) – USA
- Scotinotylus autor (Chamberlin, 1949) – USA
- Scotinotylus bicavatus Millidge, 1981 – USA
- Scotinotylus bodenburgi (Chamberlin & Ivie, 1947) – USA (Alaska)
- Scotinotylus boreus Millidge, 1981 – Canada
- Scotinotylus castoris (Chamberlin, 1949) – USA
- Scotinotylus clavatus (Schenkel, 1927) – Switzerland, Austria
- Scotinotylus columbia (Chamberlin, 1949) – Canada
- Scotinotylus crinitis Millidge, 1981 – USA
- Scotinotylus dubiosus Millidge, 1981 – USA
- Scotinotylus eutypus (Chamberlin, 1949) – Russia (Siberia), Japan, North America
- Scotinotylus evansi (O. Pickard-Cambridge, 1894) – Greenland, Europe, West Siberia
- Scotinotylus exsectoides Millidge, 1981 – Canada
- Scotinotylus formicarius (Dondale & Redner, 1972) – USA
- Scotinotylus gracilis Millidge, 1981 – USA
- Scotinotylus humilis Millidge, 1981 – USA
- Scotinotylus kenus (Chamberlin, 1949) – USA
- Scotinotylus kimjoopili Eskov & Marusik, 1994 – Russia
- Scotinotylus kolymensis Eskov & Marusik, 1994 – Russia
- Scotinotylus levii Marusik, 1988 – Russia
- Scotinotylus majesticus (Chamberlin & Ivie, 1947) – Canada, USA
- Scotinotylus millidgei Eskov, 1989 – Russia
- Scotinotylus montanus Millidge, 1981 – USA
- Scotinotylus pallidus (Emerton, 1882) – USA, Canada
- Scotinotylus patellatus (Emerton, 1917) – Canada, USA
- Scotinotylus pollucis Millidge, 1981 – USA
- Scotinotylus protervus (L. Koch, 1879) – Russia, Kazakhstan, Mongolia, USA (Alaska), Canada
- Scotinotylus provincialis Denis, 1949 – France
- Scotinotylus provo (Chamberlin, 1949) – USA
- Scotinotylus regalis Millidge, 1981 – USA
- Scotinotylus sacer (Crosby, 1929) – Russia (Siberia), USA (Alaska), Canada, Greenland
- Scotinotylus sacratus Millidge, 1981 – USA
- Scotinotylus sagittatus Millidge, 1981 – USA
- Scotinotylus sanctus (Crosby, 1929) – USA, Canada
- Scotinotylus sintalutus Millidge, 1981 – Canada
- Scotinotylus tianschanicus Tanasevitch, 1989 – Central Asia
- Scotinotylus venetus (Thorell, 1875) – Italy
- Scotinotylus vernalis (Emerton, 1882) – USA, Canada
- Scotinotylus vettonicus Barrientos & Hernández-Corral, 2020 – Spain, France
