= Scotinotylus clavatus =

Scientific classification
- Domain: Eukaryota
- Kingdom: Animalia
- Phylum: Arthropoda
- Subphylum: Chelicerata
- Class: Arachnida
- Order: Araneae
- Infraorder: Araneomorphae
- Family: Linyphiidae
- Genus: Scotinotylus
- Species: S. clavatus

Binomial name
- Scotinotylus clavatus (Schenkel, 1927)

Species of spider

Scotinotylus clavatus is a species of sheet weaver found in Austria and Switzerland. It was described by Schenkel in 1927.
