= Scotinotylus antennatus =

Scientific classification
- Domain: Eukaryota
- Kingdom: Animalia
- Phylum: Arthropoda
- Subphylum: Chelicerata
- Class: Arachnida
- Order: Araneae
- Infraorder: Araneomorphae
- Family: Linyphiidae
- Genus: Scotinotylus
- Species: S. antennatus

Binomial name
- Scotinotylus antennatus (O.P.-Cambridge, 1875)

Species of spider

Scotinotylus antennatus is a species of sheet weaver found in Europe, Kazakhstan and Russia. It was described by O.P.-Cambridge in 1875.
