= Labicymbium cognatum =

Scientific classification
- Kingdom: Animalia
- Phylum: Arthropoda
- Subphylum: Chelicerata
- Class: Arachnida
- Order: Araneae
- Infraorder: Araneomorphae
- Family: Linyphiidae
- Genus: Labicymbium
- Species: L. cognatum

Binomial name
- Labicymbium cognatum Millidge, 1991

Species of spider

Labicymbium cognatum is a species of sheet weaver found in Peru. It was described by Millidge in 1991.
