= Scotinotylus alienus =

Scientific classification
- Domain: Eukaryota
- Kingdom: Animalia
- Phylum: Arthropoda
- Subphylum: Chelicerata
- Class: Arachnida
- Order: Araneae
- Infraorder: Araneomorphae
- Family: Linyphiidae
- Genus: Scotinotylus
- Species: S. alienus

Binomial name
- Scotinotylus alienus (Kulczynski, 1885)

Species of spider

Scotinotylus alienus is a species of sheet weaver found in Alaska, Canada and Russia. It was described by Kulczynski in 1885.
