= Scotinotylus altaicus =

Scientific classification
- Kingdom: Animalia
- Phylum: Arthropoda
- Subphylum: Chelicerata
- Class: Arachnida
- Order: Araneae
- Infraorder: Araneomorphae
- Family: Linyphiidae
- Genus: Scotinotylus
- Species: S. altaicus

Binomial name
- Scotinotylus altaicus Marusik, Hippa & Koponen, 1996

Species of spider

Scotinotylus altaicus is a species of sheet weaver found in Russia. It was described by Marusik, Hippa & Koponen in 1996.
