= Deretrachys pellitus =

Scientific classification
- Domain: Eukaryota
- Kingdom: Animalia
- Phylum: Arthropoda
- Class: Insecta
- Order: Coleoptera
- Suborder: Polyphaga
- Infraorder: Cucujiformia
- Family: Cerambycidae
- Genus: Deretrachys
- Species: D. pellitus

Binomial name
- Deretrachys pellitus (Kirsch, 1889)

Species of beetle

Deretrachys pellitus is a species of beetle in the family Cerambycidae. It was described by Theodor Franz Wilhelm Kirsch in 1889.
