= Scotinotylus levii =

Scientific classification
- Kingdom: Animalia
- Phylum: Arthropoda
- Subphylum: Chelicerata
- Class: Arachnida
- Order: Araneae
- Infraorder: Araneomorphae
- Family: Linyphiidae
- Genus: Scotinotylus
- Species: S. levii

Binomial name
- Scotinotylus levii Marusik, 1988

Species of spider

Scotinotylus levii is a species of sheet weaver found in Russia. It was described by Marusik in 1988.
