= Labicymbium =

Scientific classification
- Kingdom: Animalia
- Phylum: Arthropoda
- Subphylum: Chelicerata
- Class: Arachnida
- Order: Araneae
- Infraorder: Araneomorphae
- Family: Linyphiidae
- Genus: Labicymbium; Millidge, 1991

Type species
- L. sturmi Millidge, 1991

Species
- 20, see text

Genus of spiders

Labicymbium is a genus of South American dwarf spiders that was first described by Alfred Frank Millidge in 1991.

== Species ==
As of May 2019 it contains twenty species, found in Brazil, Colombia, Ecuador, Peru, and Venezuela:

- Labicymbium ambiguum Millidge, 1991 – Colombia
- Labicymbium auctum Millidge, 1991 – Colombia
- Labicymbium avium Millidge, 1991 – Ecuador
- Labicymbium breve Millidge, 1991 – Colombia
- Labicymbium cognatum Millidge, 1991 – Peru
- Labicymbium cordiforme Millidge, 1991 – Colombia
- Labicymbium curitiba Rodrigues, 2008 – Brazil
- Labicymbium dentichele Millidge, 1991 – Peru
- Labicymbium exiguum Millidge, 1991 – Colombia
- Labicymbium fuscum Millidge, 1991 – Colombia
- Labicymbium jucundum Millidge, 1991 – Colombia
- Labicymbium majus Millidge, 1991 – Colombia
- Labicymbium montanum Millidge, 1991 – Venezuela
- Labicymbium nigrum Millidge, 1991 – Colombia
- Labicymbium opacum Millidge, 1991 – Colombia
- Labicymbium otti Rodrigues, 2008 – Brazil
- Labicymbium rancho Ott & Lise, 1997 – Brazil
- Labicymbium rusticulum (Keyserling, 1891) – Brazil
- Labicymbium sturmi Millidge, 1991 (type) – Colombia
- Labicymbium sublestum Millidge, 1991 – Colombia, Ecuador
