= Labicymbium curitiba =

Scientific classification
- Domain: Eukaryota
- Kingdom: Animalia
- Phylum: Arthropoda
- Subphylum: Chelicerata
- Class: Arachnida
- Order: Araneae
- Infraorder: Araneomorphae
- Family: Linyphiidae
- Genus: Labicymbium
- Species: L. curitiba

Binomial name
- Labicymbium curitiba Rodrigues, 2008

Species of spider

Labicymbium curitiba is a species of sheet weaver found in Brazil. It was described by Rodrigues in 2008.
