= Scotinotylus pallidus =

Scientific classification
- Kingdom: Animalia
- Phylum: Arthropoda
- Subphylum: Chelicerata
- Class: Arachnida
- Order: Araneae
- Infraorder: Araneomorphae
- Family: Linyphiidae
- Genus: Scotinotylus
- Species: S. pallidus

Binomial name
- Scotinotylus pallidus (Emerton, 1882)

Species of spider

Scotinotylus pallidus is a species of sheet weaver found in Canada and the United States. It was described by Emerton in 1882.
