= Scotinotylus evansi =

Scientific classification
- Kingdom: Animalia
- Phylum: Arthropoda
- Subphylum: Chelicerata
- Class: Arachnida
- Order: Araneae
- Infraorder: Araneomorphae
- Family: Linyphiidae
- Genus: Scotinotylus
- Species: S. evansi

Binomial name
- Scotinotylus evansi (O.P.-Cambridge, 1894)

Species of spider

Scotinotylus evansi is a species of sheet weaver found in the Palearctic. It was described by O.P.-Cambridge in 1894.
