= Scotinotylus boreus =

Scientific classification
- Domain: Eukaryota
- Kingdom: Animalia
- Phylum: Arthropoda
- Subphylum: Chelicerata
- Class: Arachnida
- Order: Araneae
- Infraorder: Araneomorphae
- Family: Linyphiidae
- Genus: Scotinotylus
- Species: S. boreus

Binomial name
- Scotinotylus boreus Millidge, 1981

Species of spider

Scotinotylus boreus is a species of sheet weaver found in Canada. It was described by Millidge in 1981.
