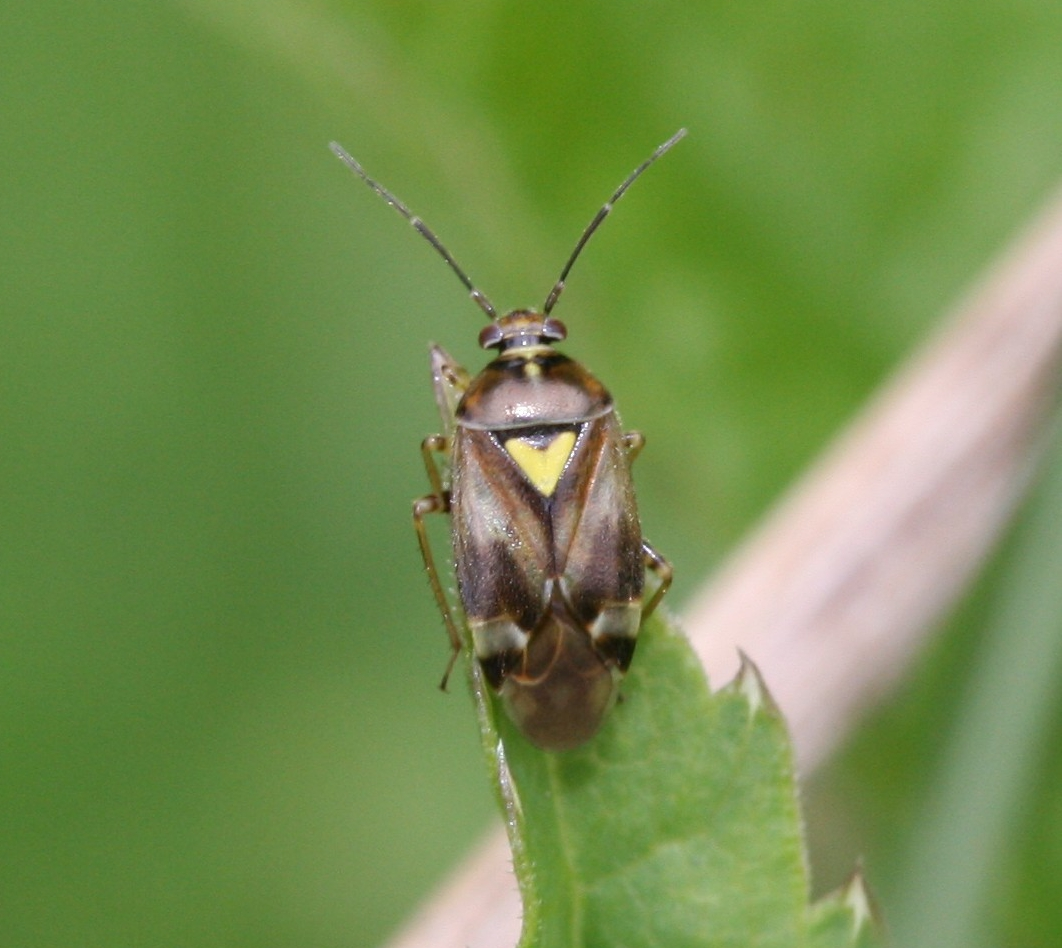
- Orthops basalis

Scientific classification
- Kingdom: Animalia
- Phylum: Arthropoda
- Class: Insecta
- Order: Hemiptera
- Suborder: Heteroptera
- Family: Miridae
- Tribe: Mirini
- Genus: Orthops; Fieber, 1858

Subgenera and species
- Orthops; Montanorthops

= Orthops =

Genus of true bugs

Orthops is a genus of plant bugs in the family Miridae. There are at least 30 described species in Orthops.

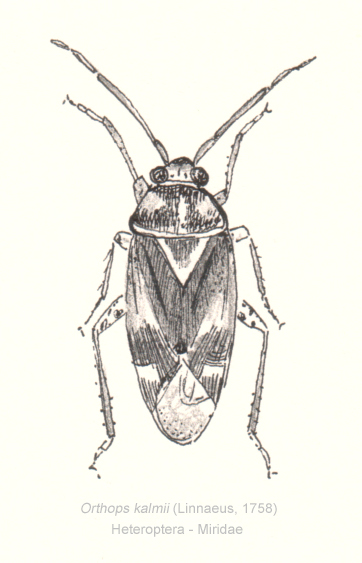
Orthops kalmii

== Species ==
These 35 species belong to the genus Orthops:

- Orthops abessinicus (Reuter, 1903)^{c g}
- Orthops acaciae (Lindberg, 1958)^{c g}
- Orthops alpicola (Poppius, 1910)^{c g}
- Orthops basalis (A. Costa, 1853)^{c g}
- Orthops brevicornis (Linnavuori, 1973)^{c g}
- Orthops campestris (Linnaeus, 1758)^{c g}
- Orthops daidalos Linnavuori, 1974^{c g}
- Orthops ferrugineus (Reuter, 1906)^{c g}
- Orthops forelii Fieber, 1858^{c g}
- Orthops ghaurii Zheng, 2004^{c g}
- Orthops kalmii (Fieber, 1858)^{i c g}
- Orthops lavandulae (Lindberg, 1958)^{c g}
- Orthops lugubris (Poppius, 1914)^{c g}
- Orthops meruensis (Poppius, 1910)^{c g}
- Orthops modestus (Linnavuori, 1973)^{c g}
- Orthops montanus (Schilling, 1837)^{c g}
- Orthops mutabilis (Buchanan-White, 1878)^{c g}
- Orthops mutans (Stal, 1858)^{c g}
- Orthops nigriscutum (Poppius, 1912)^{c g}
- Orthops nigropunctatus (Poppius, 1912)^{c g}
- Orthops palus (T. Taylor, 1947)^{c g}
- Orthops pilosulus Jakovlev, 1877^{c g}
- Orthops podocarpi Linnavuori, 1975^{c g}
- Orthops polydeukes Linnavuori, 1974^{c g}
- Orthops qualis (Distant, 1909)^{c g}
- Orthops sangvinolentus (Reuter, 1879)^{c g}
- Orthops santaluciae (Lindberg, 1958)^{c g}
- Orthops scutellatus Uhler, 1877^{i c g b} (carrot plant bug)
- Orthops sjostedti (Poppius, 1910)^{c g}
- Orthops suturellus (Poppius, 1910)^{c}
- Orthops tessulatus Linnavuori, 1975^{c g}
- Orthops unguicularis (Linnavuori, 1973)^{c g}
- Orthops versicoloreus Linnavuori, 1975^{c g}
- Orthops v-flavum (Reuter, 1907)^{c g}
- Orthops vitticeps (Reuter, 1906)^{c g}

Data sources: i = ITIS, c = Catalogue of Life, g = GBIF, b = Bugguide.net
