= Orthops scutellatus =

Scientific classification
- Kingdom: Animalia
- Phylum: Arthropoda
- Class: Insecta
- Order: Hemiptera
- Suborder: Heteroptera
- Family: Miridae
- Tribe: Mirini
- Genus: Orthops
- Species: O. scutellatus

Binomial name
- Orthops scutellatus Uhler, 1877

Species of true bug

Orthops scutellatus, the carrot plant bug, is a species of plant bug in the family Miridae. It is found in North America.
