= Scotinotylus allocotus =

Scientific classification
- Kingdom: Animalia
- Phylum: Arthropoda
- Subphylum: Chelicerata
- Class: Arachnida
- Order: Araneae
- Infraorder: Araneomorphae
- Family: Linyphiidae
- Genus: Scotinotylus
- Species: S. allocotus

Binomial name
- Scotinotylus allocotus Crawford & Edwards, 1989

Species of spider

Scotinotylus allocotus is a species of sheet weaver found in the United States. It was described by Crawford & Edwards in 1989.
