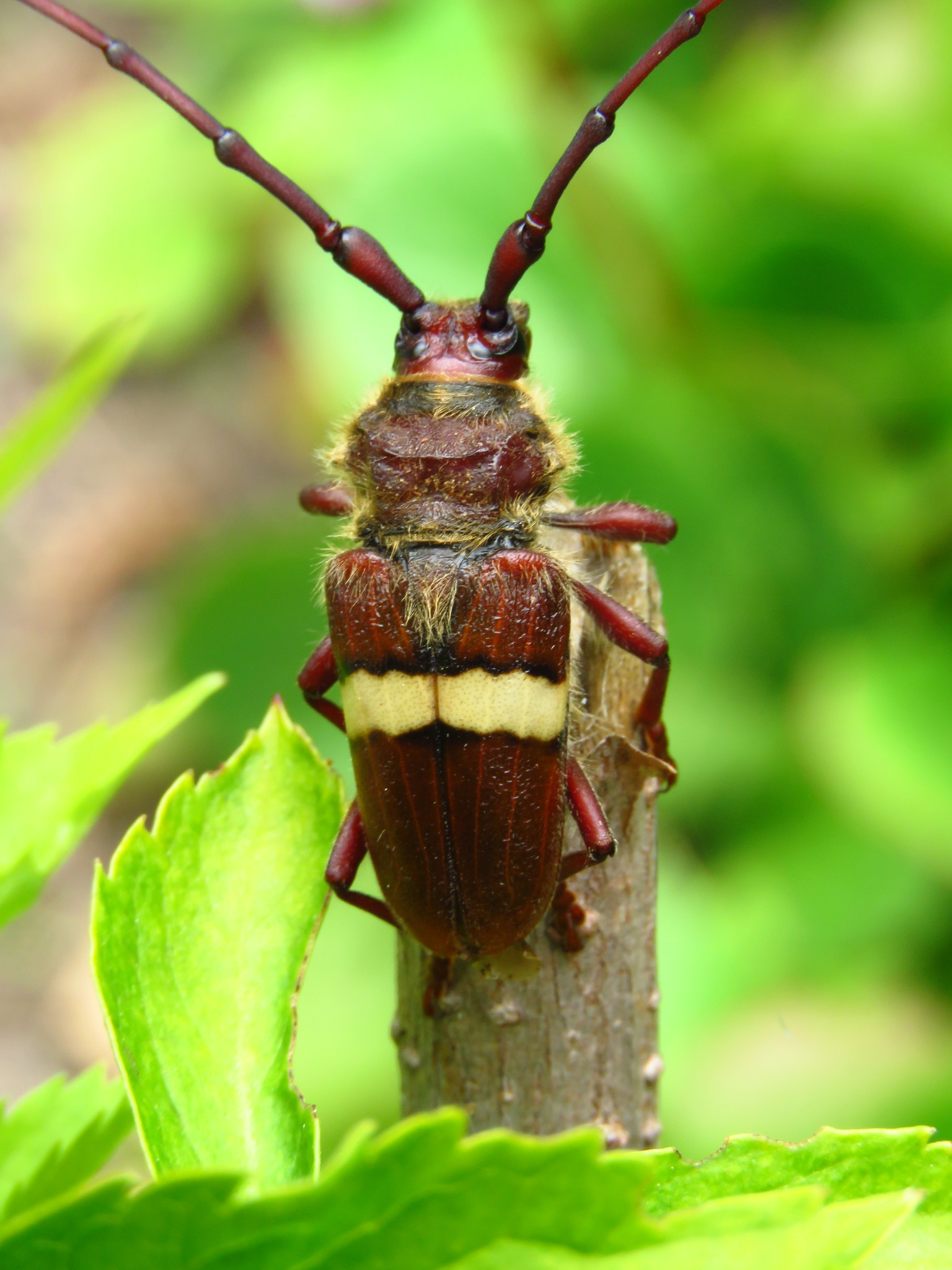

Scientific classification
- Domain: Eukaryota
- Kingdom: Animalia
- Phylum: Arthropoda
- Class: Insecta
- Order: Coleoptera
- Suborder: Polyphaga
- Infraorder: Cucujiformia
- Family: Cerambycidae
- Genus: Deretrachys
- Species: D. juvencus

Binomial name
- Deretrachys juvencus (Dupont, 1840)

= Deretrachys juvencus =

Species of beetle

Deretrachys juvencus is a species of beetle in the family Cerambycidae. It was described by Dupont in 1840.
