= Scotinotylus sagittatus =

Scientific classification
- Domain: Eukaryota
- Kingdom: Animalia
- Phylum: Arthropoda
- Subphylum: Chelicerata
- Class: Arachnida
- Order: Araneae
- Infraorder: Araneomorphae
- Family: Linyphiidae
- Genus: Scotinotylus
- Species: S. sagittatus

Binomial name
- Scotinotylus sagittatus Millidge, 1981

Species of spider

Scotinotylus sagittatus is a species of sheet weaver found in the United States. It was described by Millidge in 1981.

== Natural habitats ==
- Forests: Commonly found in coniferous and mixed forests, where ample leaf litter and dense understory vegetation provide ideal conditions.
- Grasslands and meadows: Occupies areas with low vegetation that support the construction of characteristic sheet webs.
- Moist microhabitats: Inhabits damp environments such as those beneath logs, stones, leaf litter, and moss.
- Tundra and boreal regions: Documented in northern climates, including parts of Scandinavia, Russia, and northern North America, reflecting the genus's adaptation to cooler environments.
