= Deretrachys chilensis =

Scientific classification
- Domain: Eukaryota
- Kingdom: Animalia
- Phylum: Arthropoda
- Class: Insecta
- Order: Coleoptera
- Suborder: Polyphaga
- Infraorder: Cucujiformia
- Family: Cerambycidae
- Genus: Deretrachys
- Species: D. chilensis

Binomial name
- Deretrachys chilensis (Bosq, 1949)

Species of beetle

Deretrachys chilensis is a species of beetle in the family Cerambycidae. It was described by Bosq in 1949.
