= Scotinotylus provincialis =

Scientific classification
- Kingdom: Animalia
- Phylum: Arthropoda
- Subphylum: Chelicerata
- Class: Arachnida
- Order: Araneae
- Infraorder: Araneomorphae
- Family: Linyphiidae
- Genus: Scotinotylus
- Species: S. provincialis

Binomial name
- Scotinotylus provincialis Denis, 1949

Species of spider

Scotinotylus provincialis is a species of sheet weaver spider found in France. It was described by Jacques Denis in 1949.
