= Labicymbium rancho =

Scientific classification
- Domain: Eukaryota
- Kingdom: Animalia
- Phylum: Arthropoda
- Subphylum: Chelicerata
- Class: Arachnida
- Order: Araneae
- Infraorder: Araneomorphae
- Family: Linyphiidae
- Genus: Labicymbium
- Species: L. rancho

Binomial name
- Labicymbium rancho Ott & Lise, 1997

Species of spider

Labicymbium rancho is a species of sheet weaver found in Brazil. It was described by Ott & Lise in 1997.
