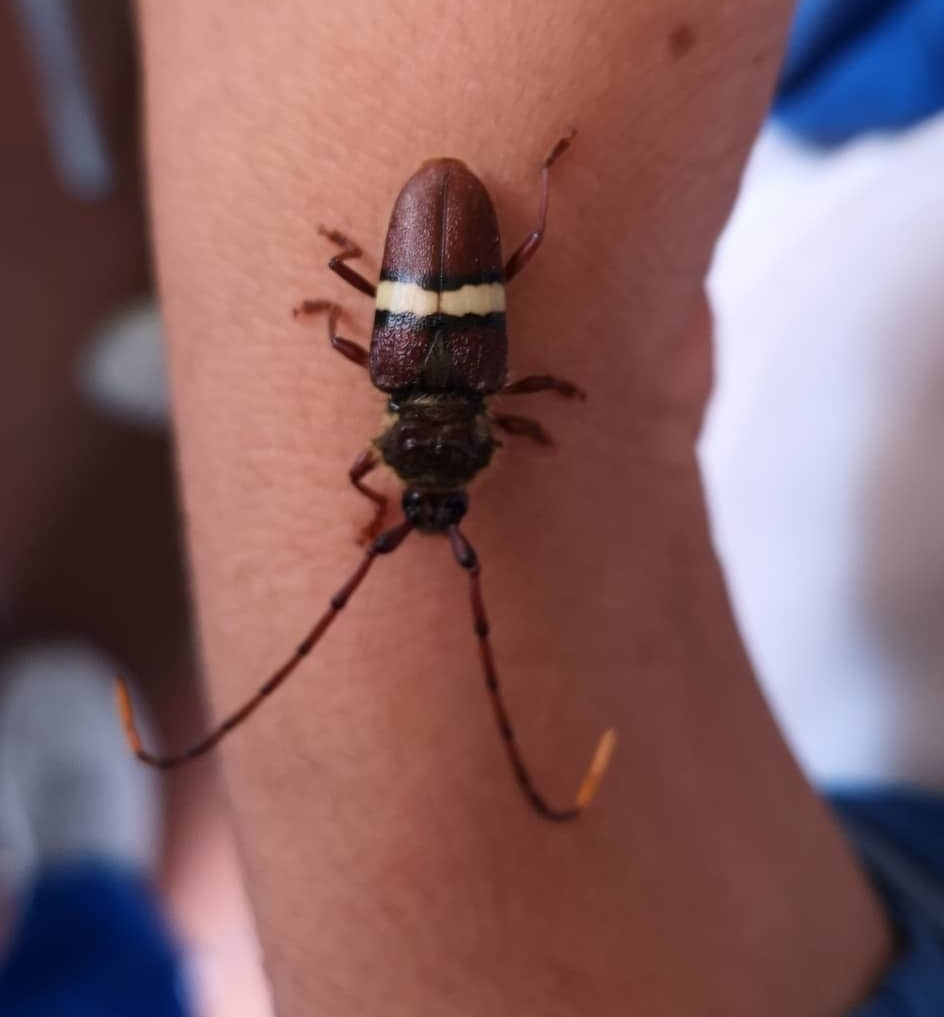
- Deretrachys juvencus

Scientific classification
- Domain: Eukaryota
- Kingdom: Animalia
- Phylum: Arthropoda
- Class: Insecta
- Order: Coleoptera
- Suborder: Polyphaga
- Infraorder: Cucujiformia
- Family: Cerambycidae
- Subfamily: Cerambycinae
- Tribe: Trachyderini
- Genus: Deretrachys; Hüdepohl, 1985

= Deretrachys =

Genus of beetles

Deretrachys is a genus of beetles in the family Cerambycidae, containing the following species:

- Deretrachys chilensis (Bosq, 1949)
- Deretrachys juvencus (Dupont, 1840)
- Deretrachys montanus (Tippmann, 1953)
- Deretrachys pellitus (Kirsch, 1889)
- Deretrachys villiersi Huedepohl, 1985
