= Scotinotylus alpinus =

Scientific classification
- Domain: Eukaryota
- Kingdom: Animalia
- Phylum: Arthropoda
- Subphylum: Chelicerata
- Class: Arachnida
- Order: Araneae
- Infraorder: Araneomorphae
- Family: Linyphiidae
- Genus: Scotinotylus
- Species: S. alpinus

Binomial name
- Scotinotylus alpinus (Banks, 1896)

Species of spider

Scotinotylus alpinus is a species of sheet weaver found in Canada, Greenland, Mongolia, Russia and the United States. It was described by Banks in 1896.
