= Labicymbium jucundum =

Scientific classification
- Domain: Eukaryota
- Kingdom: Animalia
- Phylum: Arthropoda
- Subphylum: Chelicerata
- Class: Arachnida
- Order: Araneae
- Infraorder: Araneomorphae
- Family: Linyphiidae
- Genus: Labicymbium
- Species: L. jucundum

Binomial name
- Labicymbium jucundum Millidge, 1991

Species of spider

Labicymbium jucundum is a species of sheet weaver found in Colombia. It was described by Millidge in 1991.
