= Scotinotylus gracilis =

Scientific classification
- Kingdom: Animalia
- Phylum: Arthropoda
- Subphylum: Chelicerata
- Class: Arachnida
- Order: Araneae
- Infraorder: Araneomorphae
- Family: Linyphiidae
- Genus: Scotinotylus
- Species: S. gracilis

Binomial name
- Scotinotylus gracilis Millidge, 1981

Species of spider

Scotinotylus gracilis is a species of spider in the family Linyphiidae (sheet weavers), found in the United States. It was described by Millidge in 1981.
