= Scotinotylus bodenburgi =

Scientific classification
- Kingdom: Animalia
- Phylum: Arthropoda
- Subphylum: Chelicerata
- Class: Arachnida
- Order: Araneae
- Infraorder: Araneomorphae
- Family: Linyphiidae
- Genus: Scotinotylus
- Species: S. bodenburgi

Binomial name
- Scotinotylus bodenburgi (Chamberlin & Ivie, 1947)

Species of spider

Scotinotylus bodenburgi is a species of sheet weaver found in Alaska. It was described by Chamberlin & Ivie in 1947.
