= Bulbophyllum lichenoides =

Scientific classification
- Kingdom: Plantae
- Clade: Tracheophytes
- Clade: Angiosperms
- Clade: Monocots
- Order: Asparagales
- Family: Orchidaceae
- Subfamily: Epidendroideae
- Genus: Bulbophyllum
- Species: B. lichenoides

Binomial name
- Bulbophyllum lichenoides Schltr.

Species of orchid

Bulbophyllum lichenoides is a species of orchid in the genus Bulbophyllum. This plant is non-poisonous. It is found in New Guinea, growing on trees in rainforests at elevations around 800 meters. This mini-miniature epiphyte has barely noticeable, cylindrical pseudobulbs that carry a single, apical, oblong, obtuse leaf. It blooms in late winter and early spring on an erect, short, single flowered inflorescence that reaches up to 0.12 inches (3 mm) in length.

Schlechter states that the plant is so small and delicate that it appears to be a lichen. The flowers are the smallest in the section, and are either violet red or violet brown with a dark purple lip.
