= Deretrachys montanus =

Scientific classification
- Domain: Eukaryota
- Kingdom: Animalia
- Phylum: Arthropoda
- Class: Insecta
- Order: Coleoptera
- Suborder: Polyphaga
- Infraorder: Cucujiformia
- Family: Cerambycidae
- Genus: Deretrachys
- Species: D. montanus

Binomial name
- Deretrachys montanus (Tippmann, 1953)

Species of beetle

Deretrachys montanus is a species of beetle in the family Cerambycidae. It was described by Tippmann in 1953.
