= Bulbophyllum finisterrae =

Scientific classification
- Kingdom: Plantae
- Clade: Tracheophytes
- Clade: Angiosperms
- Clade: Monocots
- Order: Asparagales
- Family: Orchidaceae
- Subfamily: Epidendroideae
- Genus: Bulbophyllum
- Species: B. finisterrae

Binomial name
- Bulbophyllum finisterrae Schltr.

Species of orchid

Bulbophyllum finisterrae is a species of orchid in the genus Bulbophyllum that is native to the Epiphyte in the lower montane forest of New Guinea. Bulbophyllum finisterrae was discovered by Rudolf Schlechter. The Bulbophyllum finisterrae has yellow petals and flowers in January.
