= Orthops montanus =

Scientific classification
- Kingdom: Animalia
- Phylum: Arthropoda
- Class: Insecta
- Order: Hemiptera
- Suborder: Heteroptera
- Family: Miridae
- Genus: Orthops
- Species: O. montanus

Binomial name
- Orthops montanus (Schilling, 1837)

Synonyms
- Phytocoris montanus Schilling, 1837

Species of true bug

Orthops montanus is a species of plant bug belonging to the family Miridae, subfamily Mirinae that can be found in Albania, Austria, Bulgaria, Czech Republic, Liechtenstein, Poland, Romania, Slovakia, Switzerland, Ukraine, Western Europe (except for Scandinavia) and all states of former Yugoslavia (except for Bosnia and Herzegovina).
