= Bulbophyllum punamense =

Scientific classification
- Kingdom: Plantae
- Clade: Tracheophytes
- Clade: Angiosperms
- Clade: Monocots
- Order: Asparagales
- Family: Orchidaceae
- Subfamily: Epidendroideae
- Genus: Bulbophyllum
- Species: B. punamense

Binomial name
- Bulbophyllum punamense Schltr.

Synonyms
- Bulbophyllum blepharoglossum Schltr. 1913; Bulbophyllum cadetioides Schltr. 1913; Diphyes blepharoglossa (Schltr.) Szlach. & Rutk. 2008; Diphyes cadetioides (Schltr.) Szlach. & Rutk. 2008

Species of orchid

Bulbophyllum punamense is a species of orchid in the genus Bulbophyllum.
