= Bulbophyllum scintilla =

Scientific classification
- Kingdom: Plantae
- Clade: Tracheophytes
- Clade: Angiosperms
- Clade: Monocots
- Order: Asparagales
- Family: Orchidaceae
- Subfamily: Epidendroideae
- Genus: Bulbophyllum
- Species: B. scintilla

Binomial name
- Bulbophyllum scintilla Ridl.

Species of orchid

Bulbophyllum scintilla is a species of orchid in the genus Bulbophyllum. it is a pseudobulbous epiphyte endemic to the Malaysian state Sarawak on the island of Borneo.
