= Johannes Montanus =

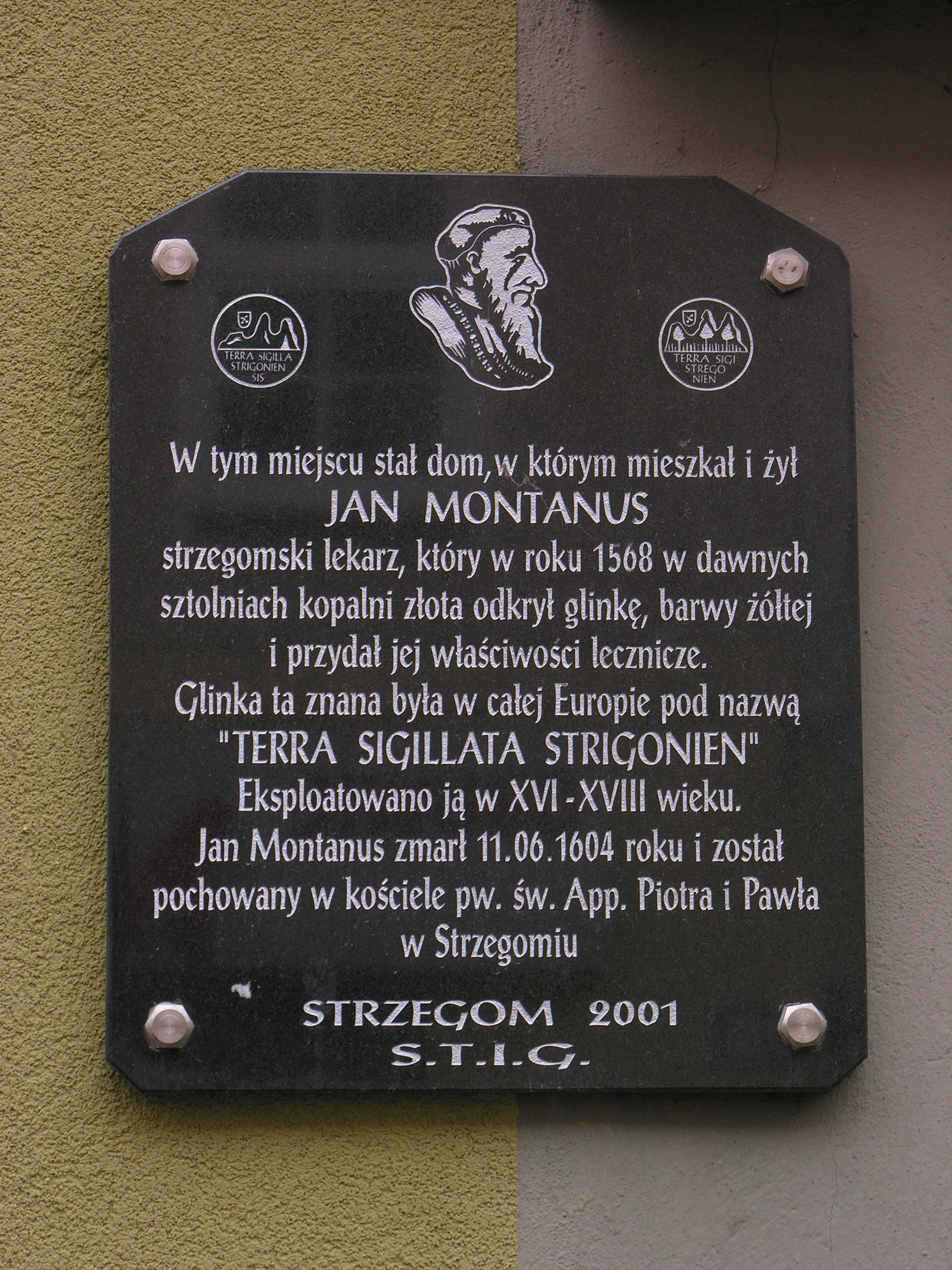
Commemorative plaque in Strzegom

Johannes Montanus (also Johannes Scultetus Montanus, 1531 - 11 June 1604) was a Silesian doctor and Paracelsist known for describing terra sigillata from Strzegom.

== Life ==
Johannes Montanus came from Striegau in Lower Silesia (now Strzegom, Poland). In 1563 he announced the discovery of terra sigillata, a medicinal clay, in the abandoned mines at Góra Bazaltowa; this variant is also called terra silesiaca. He subsequently found work as doctor of the Holy Roman Emperor Rudolf II in Prague. In 1587, he received an imperial privilege allowing him to mine and sell terra sigillata from Strzegom. He was also an important early collector of Paracelsian texts, some of which were used by Johannes Huser in his editions of Paracelsus' works.

Johannes Montanus died in 1604 and was buried in the Church of Sts. Peter and Paul in Strzegom.

== Works ==
- Judieum de terra sigillata strigoviensis, 1563.
