= Bulbophyllum xanthornis =

Scientific classification
- Kingdom: Plantae
- Clade: Tracheophytes
- Clade: Angiosperms
- Clade: Monocots
- Order: Asparagales
- Family: Orchidaceae
- Subfamily: Epidendroideae
- Genus: Bulbophyllum
- Species: B. xanthornis

Binomial name
- Bulbophyllum xanthornis Schuit. & De Vogel

Species of orchid

Bulbophyllum xanthornis is a species of orchid in the genus Bulbophyllum.

== Description ==
Rhizome rather short, creeping, scarcely branching; roots filiform, 0.6 mm in diameter. Pseudobulbs close together, oblongoid-cylindrical, obliquely erect, 6-8 by 2 mm, longitudinally grooved with age. Leaf very shortly petiolate, petiole channelled, 1.5 mm long, blade narrowly lanceolate, sometimes slightly oblique, 1.4-2.2 cm by 4-5 mm, thin-coriaceous, margins near apex minutely papillose, apex subacute. Inflorescences arising from the base of the pseudobulb, arching to pendulous, 1-flowered, 7-13 cm long. Peduncle very thin, 7-13 cm long, glabrous, consisting of one internode, at the base with a tubular, 4-5 mm long scale. Floral bract bell-shaped, oblique, 2 mm long. Pedicel with ovary 3 mm long, glabrous, terete. Dorsal sepal very narrowly linear-triangular, 2.6 cm by 3 mm, acuminate. Lateral sepals connate into a synsepalum that is rather similar to the dorsal sepal, 2.6 by 4 mm, apex bidentate. Petals narrowly lanceolate-caudate, 1.4 cm by 1.6 mm, margins densely long-ciliate, acuminate. Lip very narrowly triangular, 9.2 by 1.6 mm, at the base with two small, erect auricles on either side of a very short claw, the basal margins produced into short, erect, rounded lateral lobes fringed with long papillae, in between these lobes with a transverse strongly papillose callus; margins of the lip, except at the very base, densely long-ciliate; apex obtuse. Column very short, without the stelidia 0.6 mm long, clinandrium with a subulate filament, stelidia relatively very large, 1.4 mm long, subulate, curved inwards, on the inner margin below the apex with a triangular tooth; column-foot projecting forwards, rectangular, longer than the stelidia, 1.8 mm long. Anther cucullate with a median hump, 0.7 mm long, papillose. Pollinia 4 in two pairs, those of a pair strongly unequal, the largest obliquely ovate in outline, triangular in cross-section, 0.5 mm long, the smallest half as long and a third as wide, strongly flattened.
