= Bulbophyllum obyrnei =

Scientific classification
- Kingdom: Plantae
- Clade: Tracheophytes
- Clade: Angiosperms
- Clade: Monocots
- Order: Asparagales
- Family: Orchidaceae
- Subfamily: Epidendroideae
- Genus: Bulbophyllum
- Species: B. obyrnei

Binomial name
- Bulbophyllum obyrnei Garay, Hamer & Siegerist

Synonyms
- Osyricera ovata F.M.Bailey

Species of orchid

Bulbophyllum obyrnei is a species of flowering plant in the family Orchidaceae.
