= Bulbophyllum aberrans =

Conservation status
- CITES Appendix II (CITES)

Scientific classification
- Kingdom: Plantae
- Clade: Tracheophytes
- Clade: Angiosperms
- Clade: Monocots
- Order: Asparagales
- Family: Orchidaceae
- Subfamily: Epidendroideae
- Genus: Bulbophyllum
- Species: B. aberrans

Binomial name
- Bulbophyllum aberrans Schltr. 1911

Species of orchid from Southeast Asia

Bulbophyllum aberrans, known as the deviating bulbophyllum, is a species of orchid in the genus Bulbophyllum. It is found in Borneo and Sulawesi.
