= Bulbophyllum lophoglottis =

Scientific classification
- Kingdom: Plantae
- Clade: Tracheophytes
- Clade: Angiosperms
- Clade: Monocots
- Order: Asparagales
- Family: Orchidaceae
- Subfamily: Epidendroideae
- Genus: Bulbophyllum
- Species: B. lophoglottis

Binomial name
- Bulbophyllum lophoglottis (Guillaumin) N.Hallé

Synonyms
- Canacorchis lophoglottis Guillaumin

Species of orchid

Bulbophyllum lophoglottis is a species of orchid in the genus Bulbophyllum. It is a pseudobulbous epiphyte endemic to Mt. Ouin in southeastern New Caledonia.
