= Savignia naniplopi =

Scientific classification
- Kingdom: Animalia
- Phylum: Arthropoda
- Subphylum: Chelicerata
- Class: Arachnida
- Order: Araneae
- Infraorder: Araneomorphae
- Family: Linyphiidae
- Genus: Savignia
- Species: S. naniplopi

Binomial name
- Savignia naniplopi Bosselaers & Henderickx, 2002

Species of spider

Savignia naniplopi is a species of spiders belonging to the family Linyphiidae. It is only known from two adjacent caves, Arkalospiliara and Doxa, in Heraklion regional unit on the island of Crete, Greece.

This is a very small spider with a total length (excluding legs) of only around 1.6 millimetres (0.063 in). All parts are a plain orange colour. The sexes are rather similar apart from the male having a distinctively shaped "snout" which carries two of the eight eyes.

The specific name is a Latin rendering of "Plop the gnome", a reference to the Belgian children's TV character Kabouter Plop. This refers to the subterranean habits of this species and also to the resemblance in shape of the "snout" of the male to Kabouter Plop's hat. The species was described by two Belgians.
