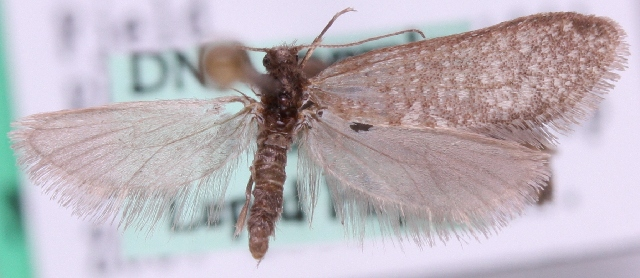

Scientific classification
- Kingdom: Animalia
- Phylum: Arthropoda
- Clade: Pancrustacea
- Class: Insecta
- Order: Lepidoptera
- Family: Psychidae
- Subfamily: Naryciinae
- Genus: Siederia; Meier, 1957

= Siederia =

Genus of moths

Siederia is a genus of small moths. It belongs to the bagworm moth family (Psychidae). Therein, it is placed in subfamily Naryciinae, or, if that is not considered sufficiently distinct, in the Taleporiinae.

Most species were formerly included in the huge "wastebin genus" Solenobia, which is technically a junior synonym of Taleporia.

Species include:

- Siederia alpicolella (Rebel, 1919)
- Siederia cembrella (Linnaeus, 1761)
- Siederia listerella
- Siederia meierella (Sieder, 1956)
- Siederia meieri
- Siederia pineti (Zeller, 1852)
- Siederia rupicolella (Sauter, 1954)
- Siederia saxatilis
