= Savignia pseudofrontata =

Scientific classification
- Domain: Eukaryota
- Kingdom: Animalia
- Phylum: Arthropoda
- Subphylum: Chelicerata
- Class: Arachnida
- Order: Araneae
- Infraorder: Araneomorphae
- Family: Linyphiidae
- Genus: Savignia
- Species: S. pseudofrontata

Binomial name
- Savignia pseudofrontata Paik, 1978

Species of spider

Savignia pseudofrontata is a species of sheet weaver found in Korea. It was first described by Paik Kap Yong in 1978.
