= Savignia superstes =

Scientific classification
- Domain: Eukaryota
- Kingdom: Animalia
- Phylum: Arthropoda
- Subphylum: Chelicerata
- Class: Arachnida
- Order: Araneae
- Infraorder: Araneomorphae
- Family: Linyphiidae
- Genus: Savignia
- Species: S. superstes

Binomial name
- Savignia superstes Thaler, 1984

Species of spider

Savignia superstes is a species of sheet weaver found in France. It was described by Thaler in 1984.
