= Savignia borea =

Scientific classification
- Domain: Eukaryota
- Kingdom: Animalia
- Phylum: Arthropoda
- Subphylum: Chelicerata
- Class: Arachnida
- Order: Araneae
- Infraorder: Araneomorphae
- Family: Linyphiidae
- Genus: Savignia
- Species: S. borea

Binomial name
- Savignia borea Eskov, 1988

Species of spider

Savignia borea is a species of sheet weaver found in Russia. It was described by Eskov in 1988.
