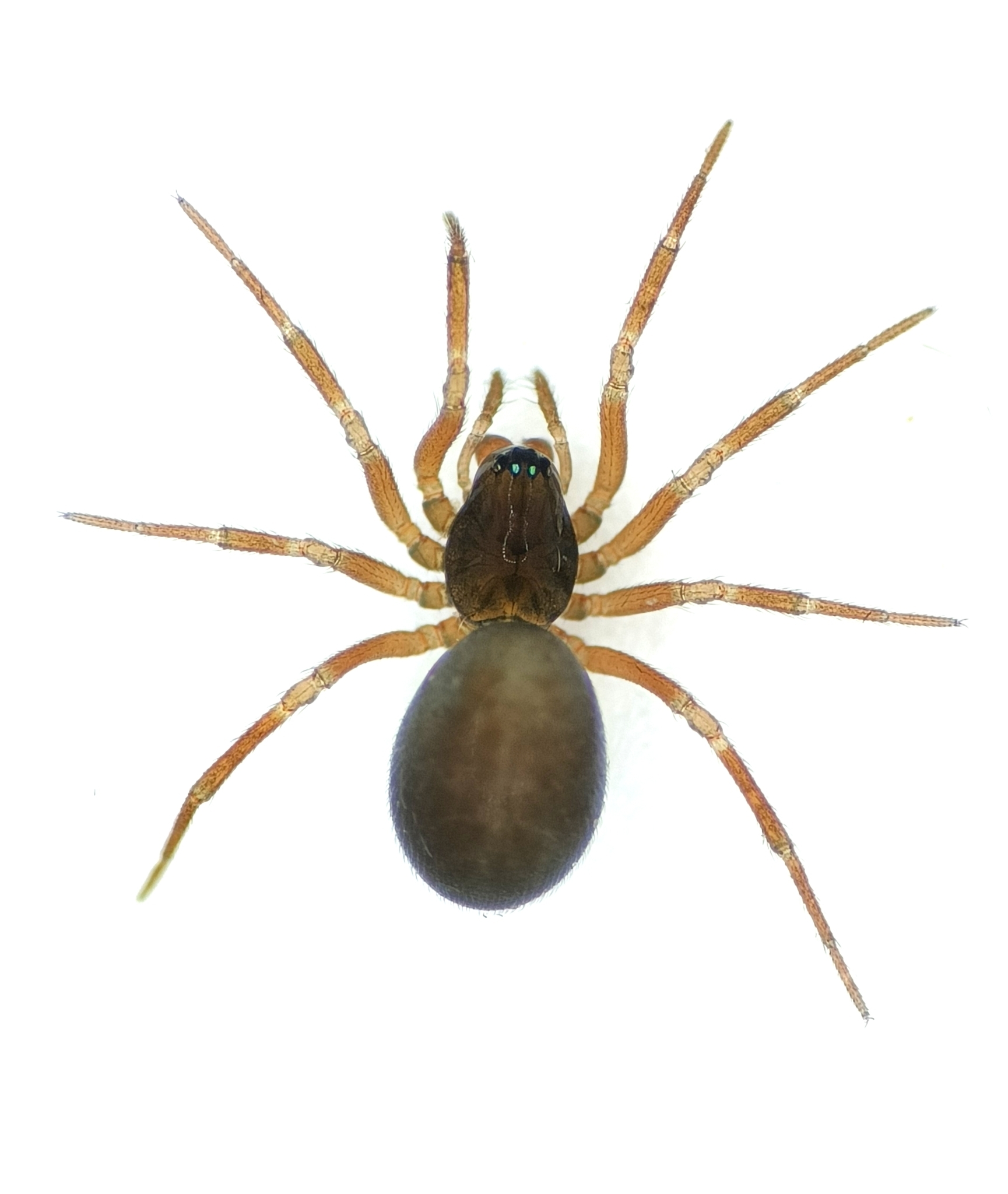

Scientific classification
- Kingdom: Animalia
- Phylum: Arthropoda
- Subphylum: Chelicerata
- Class: Arachnida
- Order: Araneae
- Infraorder: Araneomorphae
- Family: Linyphiidae
- Genus: Savignia
- Species: S. frontata

Binomial name
- Savignia frontata Blackwall, 1833

= Savignia frontata =

Species of spider

Savignia frontata is a species of sheet weaver found in the Palearctic. It was described by Blackwall in 1833.
