= Taleporia borealis =

Scientific classification
- Kingdom: Animalia
- Phylum: Arthropoda
- Clade: Pancrustacea
- Class: Insecta
- Order: Lepidoptera
- Family: Psychidae
- Genus: Taleporia
- Species: T. borealis

Binomial name
- Taleporia borealis Wocke, 1862

Species of moth

Taleporia borealis is a species of moth belonging to the family Psychidae.

It is native to Northern Europe.
