= Savignia producta =

Scientific classification
- Domain: Eukaryota
- Kingdom: Animalia
- Phylum: Arthropoda
- Subphylum: Chelicerata
- Class: Arachnida
- Order: Araneae
- Infraorder: Araneomorphae
- Family: Linyphiidae
- Genus: Savignia
- Species: S. producta

Binomial name
- Savignia producta Holm, 1977

Species of spider

Savignia producta is a species of sheet weaver found in the Palearctic. It was described by Holm in 1977.
