= Savignia eskovi =

Scientific classification
- Kingdom: Animalia
- Phylum: Arthropoda
- Subphylum: Chelicerata
- Class: Arachnida
- Order: Araneae
- Infraorder: Araneomorphae
- Family: Linyphiidae
- Genus: Savignia
- Species: S. eskovi

Binomial name
- Savignia eskovi Marusik, Koponen & Danilov, 2001

Species of spider

Savignia eskovi is a species of sheet weavers which was found in Russia. It was described by Marusik, Koponen & Danilov in 2001.
