= Siederia rupicolella =

Scientific classification
- Domain: Eukaryota
- Kingdom: Animalia
- Phylum: Arthropoda
- Class: Insecta
- Order: Lepidoptera
- Family: Psychidae
- Genus: Siederia
- Species: S. rupicolella

Binomial name
- Siederia rupicolella (Sauter, 1954)

Synonyms
- Solenobia rupicolella Sauter, 1954

Species of moth

Siederia rupicolella is a moth of the family Psychidae. It was described by Sauter in 1954. It is found in Germany, Switzerland, Norway, Sweden, Finland, Estonia and Latvia.

The wingspan is 11–16 mm. Adults have been recorded on wing from April to May.

The larvae feed on moss and algae.
