= Savignia birostrum =

Scientific classification
- Kingdom: Animalia
- Phylum: Arthropoda
- Subphylum: Chelicerata
- Class: Arachnida
- Order: Araneae
- Infraorder: Araneomorphae
- Family: Linyphiidae
- Genus: Savignia
- Species: S. birostrum

Binomial name
- Savignia birostrum (Chamberlin & Ivie, 1947)

Synonyms
- Cephalethus birostrum Chamberlin & Ivie, 1947; Savignia birostra (Chamberlin & Ivie, 1947), orth. var.; Savignia nenilini Marusik, 1988

Species of spider

Savignia birostrum is a species of sheet weaver found in Russia (from the Urals to the Far East), China, and the United States (Alaska). It was first described by Chamberlin & Ivie in 1947 as Cephalethus birostrum. The specific name birostrum is a noun, so does not change with the gender of the genus name.
