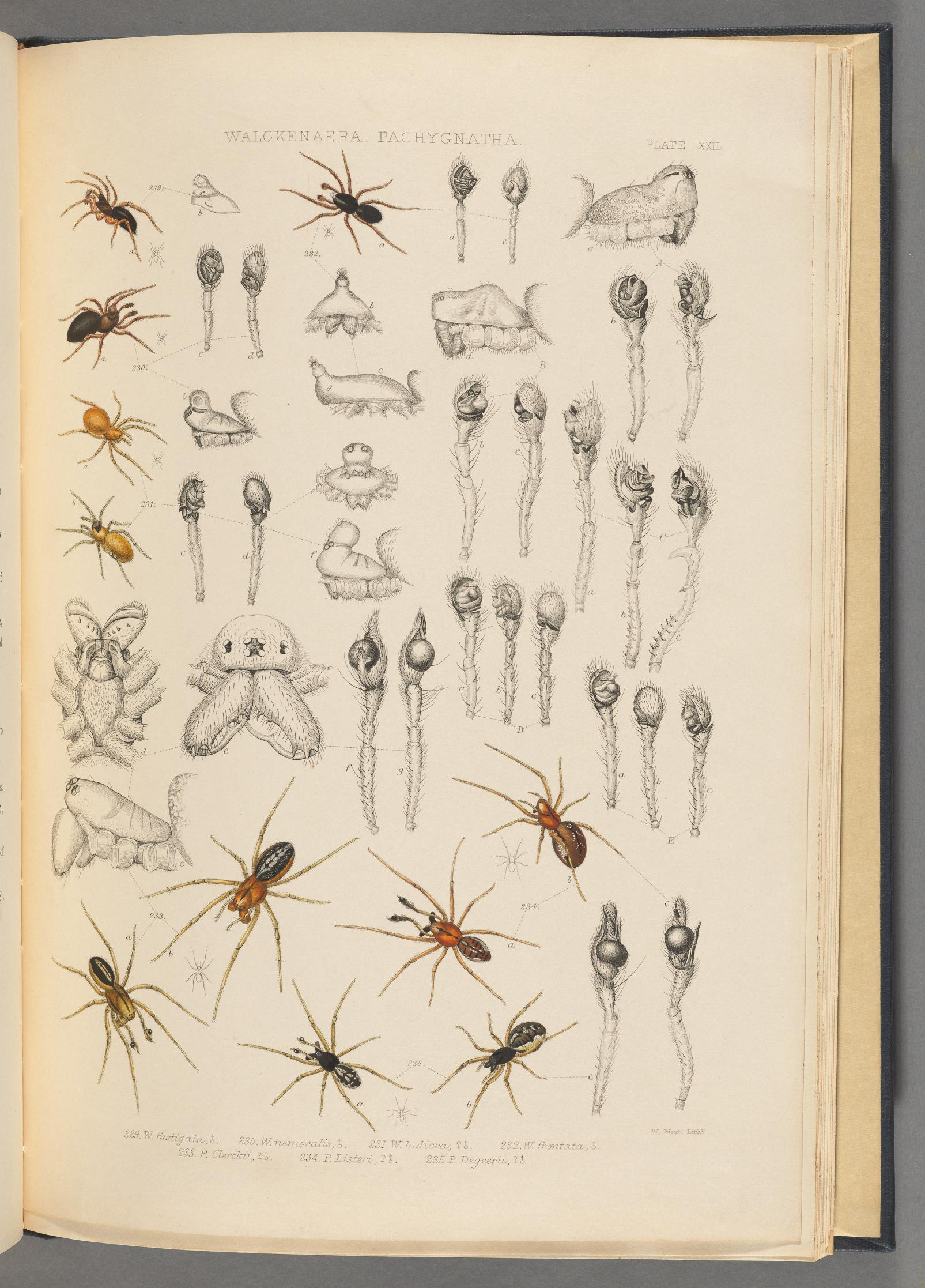
- Savignia frontata (Bl.) figure 232

Scientific classification
- Kingdom: Animalia
- Phylum: Arthropoda
- Subphylum: Chelicerata
- Class: Arachnida
- Order: Araneae
- Infraorder: Araneomorphae
- Family: Linyphiidae
- Genus: Savignia; Blackwall, 1833

Type species
- S. frontata Blackwall, 1833

Species
- 23, see text

Synonyms
- Cephalethus Chamberlin & Ivie, 1947; Delorrhipis Simon, 1884

= Savignia =

Genus of spiders

Savignia is a genus of sheet weavers that was first described by John Blackwall in 1833. The name honors the French naturalist Marie Jules César Savigny.

== Species ==
As of May 2019 it contains twenty-three species, found in Europe, Africa, Asia, Oceania, the United States, on Comoros, in Western Australia, and Alaska:

- Savignia amurensis Eskov, 1991 – Russia
- Savignia badzhalensis Eskov, 1991 – Russia
- Savignia basarukini Eskov, 1988 – Russia
- Savignia birostrum (Chamberlin & Ivie, 1947) – Russia, China, USA (Alaska)
- Savignia borea Eskov, 1988 – Russia
- Savignia bureensis Tanasevitch & Trilikauskas, 2006 – Russia
- Savignia centrasiatica Eskov, 1991 – Russia
- Savignia erythrocephala (Simon, 1908) – Australia (Western Australia)
- Savignia eskovi Marusik, Koponen & Danilov, 2001 – Russia
- Savignia frontata Blackwall, 1833 (type) – Europe, Caucasus, Russia to Kazakhstan
- Savignia fronticornis (Simon, 1884) – Mediterranean
- Savignia harmsi Wunderlich, 1980 – Spain
- Savignia kartalensis Jocqué, 1985 – Comoros
- Savignia kawachiensis Oi, 1960 – Korea, Japan
- Savignia naniplopi Bosselaers & Henderickx, 2002 – Greece (Crete)
- Savignia producta Holm, 1977 – Scandinavia, Russia
- Savignia pseudofrontata Paik, 1978 – Korea
- Savignia rostellatra Song & Li, 2009 – China
- Savignia saitoi Eskov, 1988 – Russia
- Savignia superstes Thaler, 1984 – France
- Savignia ussurica Eskov, 1988 – Russia
- Savignia yasudai (Saito, 1986) – Japan
- Savignia zero Eskov, 1988 – Russia
