= Savignia harmsi =

Scientific classification
- Domain: Eukaryota
- Kingdom: Animalia
- Phylum: Arthropoda
- Subphylum: Chelicerata
- Class: Arachnida
- Order: Araneae
- Infraorder: Araneomorphae
- Family: Linyphiidae
- Genus: Savignia
- Species: S. harmsi

Binomial name
- Savignia harmsi Wunderlich, 1980

Species of spider

Savignia harmsi is a species of sheet weaver found in Spain. It was described by Wunderlich in 1980.
