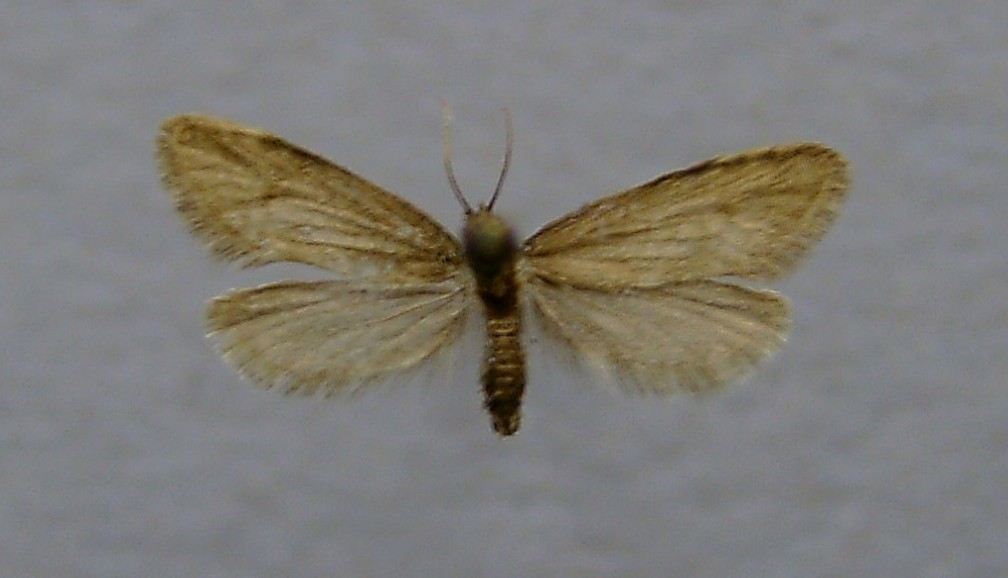
- Adult male

Scientific classification
- Kingdom: Animalia
- Phylum: Arthropoda
- Clade: Pancrustacea
- Class: Insecta
- Order: Lepidoptera
- Family: Psychidae
- Genus: Taleporia
- Species: T. tubulosa

Binomial name
- Taleporia tubulosa (Retzius, 1783)

Synonyms
- Talaeporia tubulosa (lapsus); Taleporia tessellea (Haworth, 1828); Cochleophasia tessellea (Haworth, 1828)

= Taleporia tubulosa =

Species of moth

Taleporia tubulosa, the large birch bright, is a small nocturnal moth from the bagworm moth family (Psychidae). It is found locally in Europe, from southern Scotland, through west and central Europe, east up to Russia and the Balkans. In the north it is found in Fennoscandia. In mountainous areas it is found up to heights of 1,800 meters ASL.

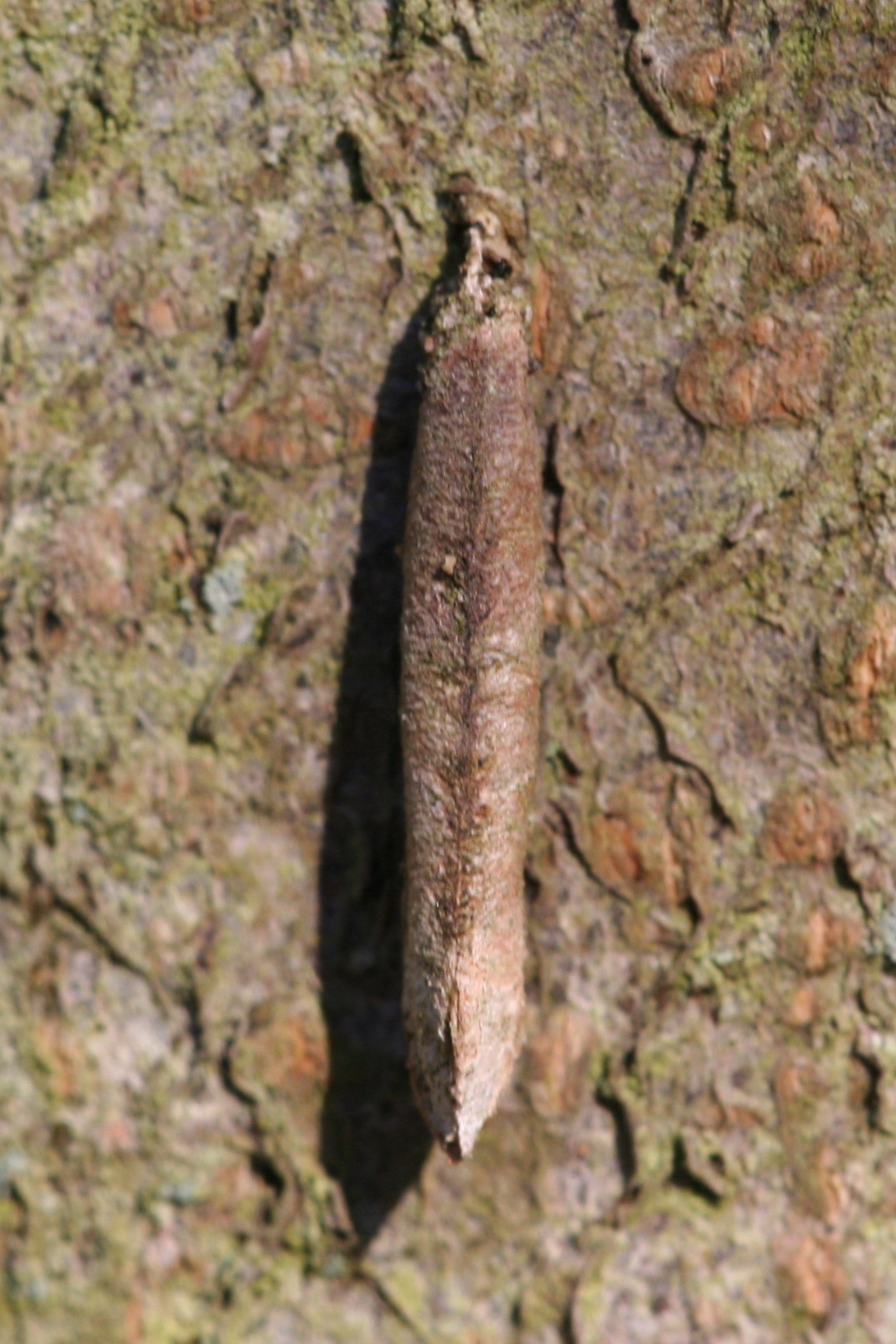
Case of caterpillar or female

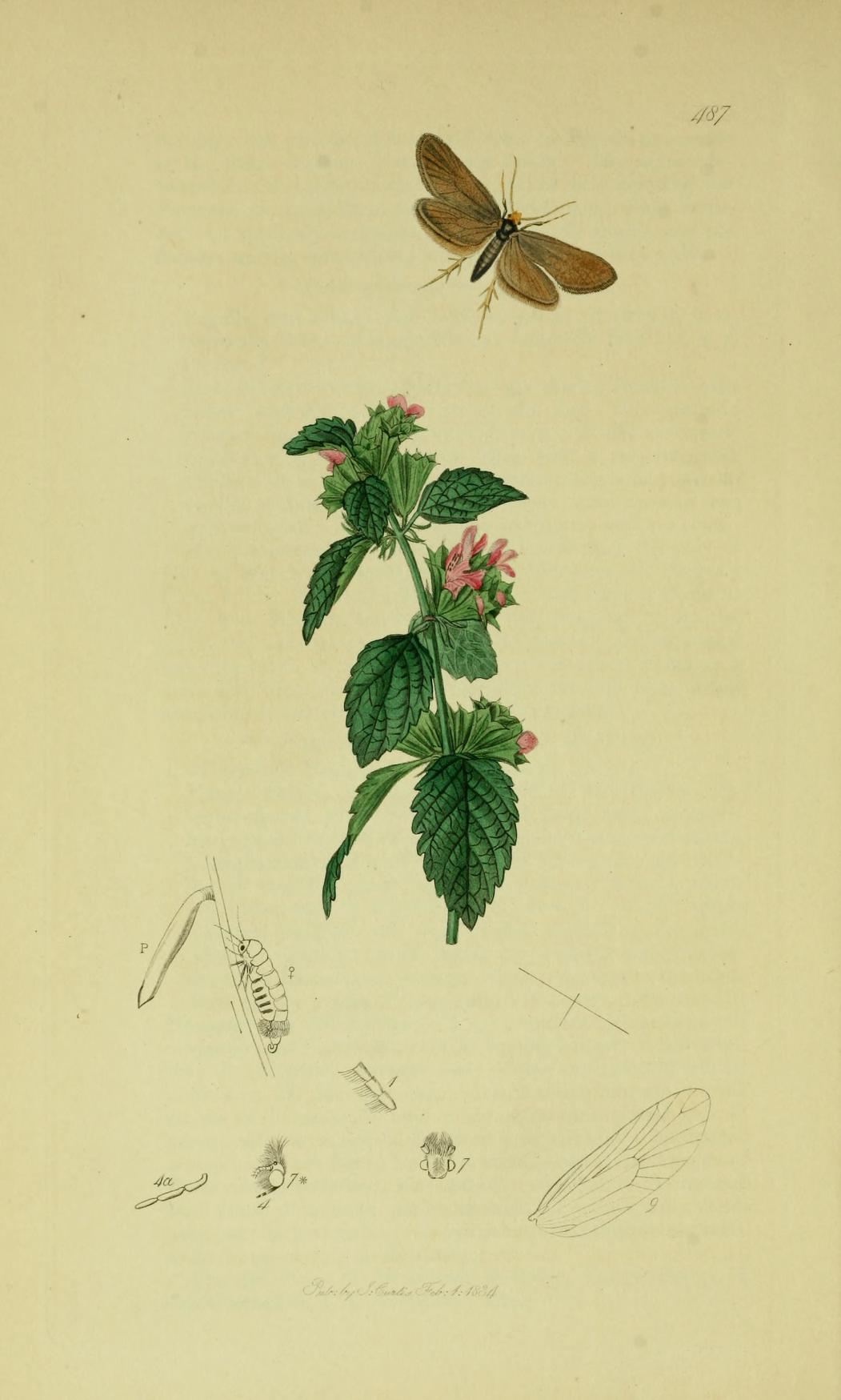
Illustration from John Curtis's British Entomology Volume 6

The wings of the male are greyish brown and look frayed, with a wingspan of 15 to 19 millimeters. The females do not have wings, as is usual for bagworm moths.

The caterpillars feed on lichen from the genus Parmelia, but they may also eat plant remains. They live in a protective casing made of grass or bark that is usually attached to a tree. The females remain in this casing when adult. The males' flight time ranges from May to June.
