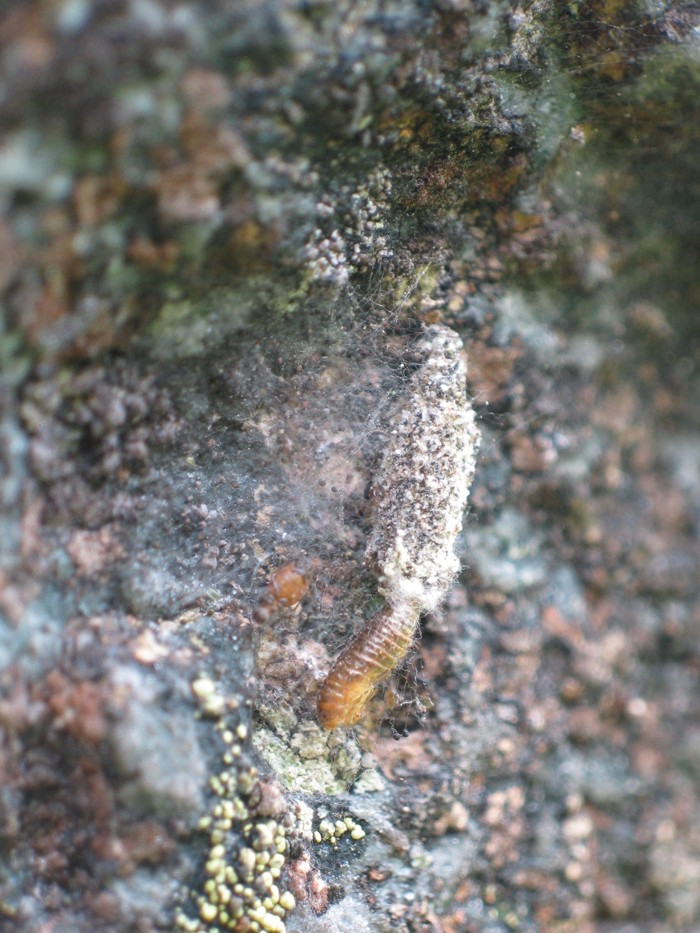

Scientific classification
- Kingdom: Animalia
- Phylum: Arthropoda
- Clade: Pancrustacea
- Class: Insecta
- Order: Lepidoptera
- Family: Psychidae
- Genus: Siederia
- Species: S. alpicolella

Binomial name
- Siederia alpicolella (Rebel, 1919)

Synonyms
- Solenobia alpicolella Rebel, 1919; Solenobia meieri Sieder, 1955; Brevantennia sacatilis Sieder, 1955

= Siederia alpicolella =

Species of moth

Siederia alpicolella is a moth of the Psychidae family. It is found in France, Austria, Switzerland and Slovenia.

The wingspan is 14–15 mm.
