= Savignia kartalensis =

Scientific classification
- Kingdom: Animalia
- Phylum: Arthropoda
- Subphylum: Chelicerata
- Class: Arachnida
- Order: Araneae
- Infraorder: Araneomorphae
- Family: Linyphiidae
- Genus: Savignia
- Species: S. kartalensis

Binomial name
- Savignia kartalensis Jocqué, 1985

Species of spider

Savignia kartalensis is a species of sheet weaver found in the Comoros Islands. It was described by Jocqué in 1985.
