= Savignia bureensis =

Scientific classification
- Kingdom: Animalia
- Phylum: Arthropoda
- Subphylum: Chelicerata
- Class: Arachnida
- Order: Araneae
- Infraorder: Araneomorphae
- Family: Linyphiidae
- Genus: Savignia
- Species: S. bureensis

Binomial name
- Savignia bureensis Tanasevitch & Trilikauskas, 2006

Species of spider

Savignia bureensis is a species of sheet weaver found in Russia. It was described by Tanasevitch & Trilikauskas in 2006.
