= Savignia erythrocephala =

Scientific classification
- Kingdom: Animalia
- Phylum: Arthropoda
- Subphylum: Chelicerata
- Class: Arachnida
- Order: Araneae
- Infraorder: Araneomorphae
- Family: Linyphiidae
- Genus: Savignia
- Species: S. erythrocephala

Binomial name
- Savignia erythrocephala (Simon, 1908)

Species of spider

Savignia erythrocephala is a species of sheet weaver found in Western Australia. It was described by Simon in 1908.
