= Savignia kawachiensis =

Scientific classification
- Domain: Eukaryota
- Kingdom: Animalia
- Phylum: Arthropoda
- Subphylum: Chelicerata
- Class: Arachnida
- Order: Araneae
- Infraorder: Araneomorphae
- Family: Linyphiidae
- Genus: Savignia
- Species: S. kawachiensis

Binomial name
- Savignia kawachiensis Oi, 1960

Species of spider

Savignia kawachiensis is a species of sheet weaver found in Japan. It was described by Oi in 1960.
