= Savignia centrasiatica =

Scientific classification
- Kingdom: Animalia
- Phylum: Arthropoda
- Subphylum: Chelicerata
- Class: Arachnida
- Order: Araneae
- Infraorder: Araneomorphae
- Family: Linyphiidae
- Genus: Savignia
- Species: S. centrasiatica

Binomial name
- Savignia centrasiatica Eskov, 1991

Species of spider

Savignia centrasiatica is a species of sheet weaver found in Russia. It was described by Eskov in 1991. This species is known to be found in Russia, particularly in the Asiatic part of the country. As a member of the Savignia genus, it is characterized by its small size (typically 1.5–2 mm in body length) and is part of a group of spiders that construct sheet-like webs to capture prey. Little specific information is available about its morphology, behavior, or habitat preferences beyond its classification and geographic distribution, as it is one of many lesser-studied species in the Savignia genus.
