= Taleporia henderickxi =

Scientific classification
- Domain: Eukaryota
- Kingdom: Animalia
- Phylum: Arthropoda
- Class: Insecta
- Order: Lepidoptera
- Family: Psychidae
- Genus: Taleporia
- Species: T. henderickxi

Binomial name
- Taleporia henderickxi Arnscheid, 2016

Species of moth

Taleporia henderickxi is a moth of the Psychidae family. It is found on Crete and is the sole Taleporia species known to occur there.

Taleporia henderickxi is dedicated to Belgian entomologist Hans Henderickx.
