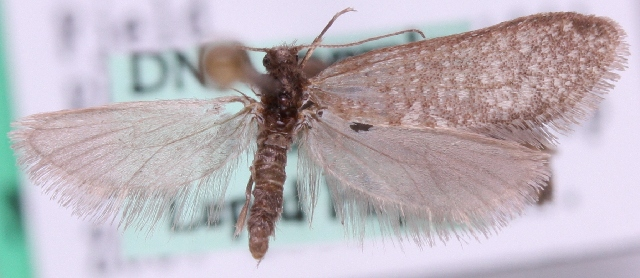

Scientific classification
- Kingdom: Animalia
- Phylum: Arthropoda
- Class: Insecta
- Order: Lepidoptera
- Family: Psychidae
- Genus: Siederia
- Species: S. listerella

Binomial name
- Siederia listerella (Linnaeus, 1758)

Synonyms
- Phalaena listerella Linnaeus, 1758; Tinea cembrella Linnaeus, 1761; Solenobia pineti Zeller, 1852

= Siederia listerella =

Species of moth

Siederia listerella is a moth of the Psychidae family. It was described by Carl Linnaeus in 1758. It is found in most of Europe, except Ireland, Great Britain, the Iberian Peninsula and most of the Balkan Peninsula.

The wingspan is 11–15 mm. Adults have been recorded on wing from the end of May to the beginning of June.
