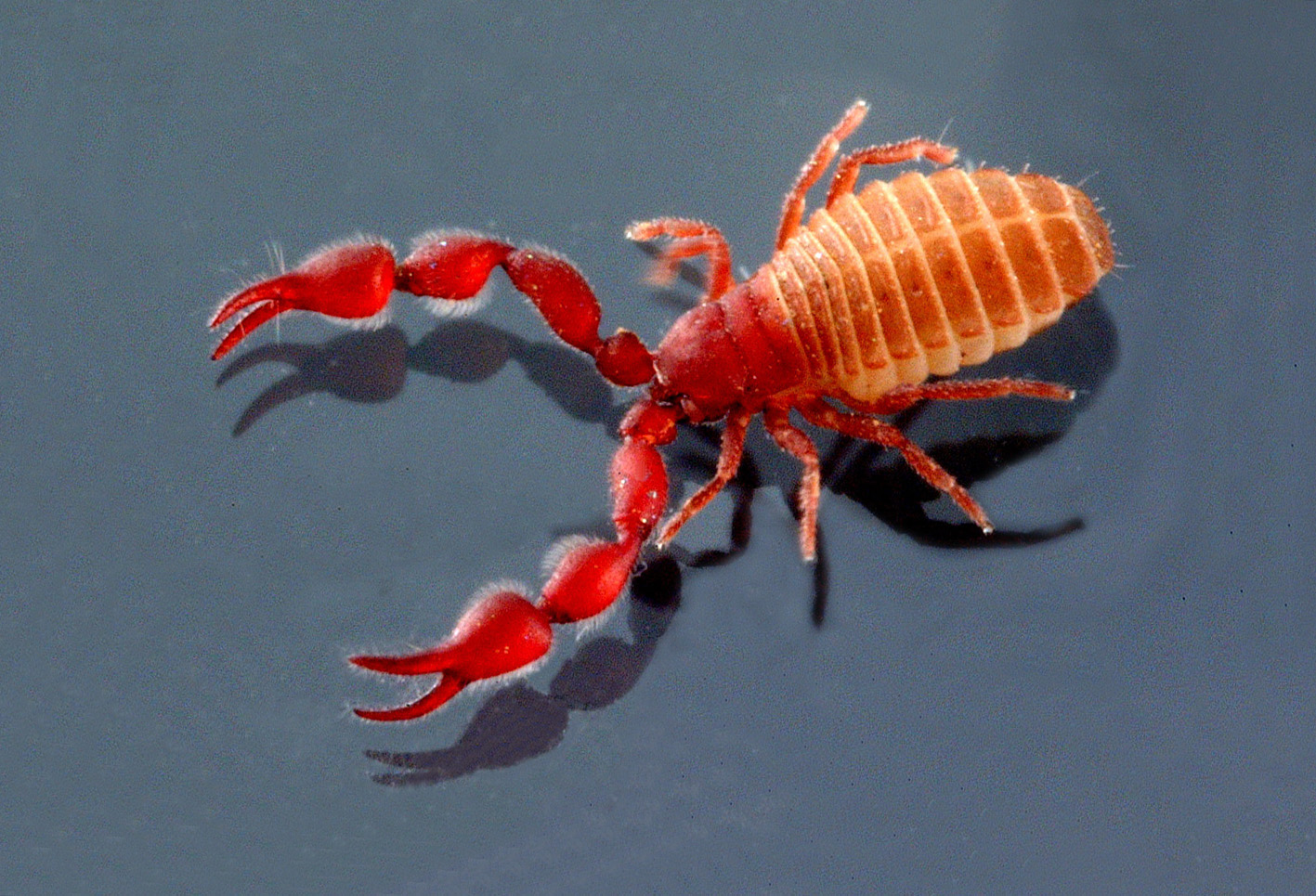

Scientific classification
- Domain: Eukaryota
- Kingdom: Animalia
- Phylum: Arthropoda
- Subphylum: Chelicerata
- Class: Arachnida
- Order: Pseudoscorpiones
- Family: Chernetidae
- Genus: Lasiochernes
- Species: L. cretonatus

Binomial name
- Lasiochernes cretonatus Henderickx, 1998

= Lasiochernes cretonatus =

Species of pseudoscorpion

Lasiochernes cretonatus is a species of pseudoscorpion discovered in the late 1990s in the Souré cave in Crete.
