= Savignia yasudai =

Scientific classification
- Domain: Eukaryota
- Kingdom: Animalia
- Phylum: Arthropoda
- Subphylum: Chelicerata
- Class: Arachnida
- Order: Araneae
- Infraorder: Araneomorphae
- Family: Linyphiidae
- Genus: Savignia
- Species: S. yasudai

Binomial name
- Savignia yasudai (Saito, 1986)

Species of spider

Savignia yasudai is a species of sheet weaver found in Japan. It was described by Saito in 1986.
