= Savignia fronticornis =

Scientific classification
- Kingdom: Animalia
- Phylum: Arthropoda
- Subphylum: Chelicerata
- Class: Arachnida
- Order: Araneae
- Infraorder: Araneomorphae
- Family: Linyphiidae
- Genus: Savignia
- Species: S. fronticornis

Binomial name
- Savignia fronticornis (Simon, 1884)

Species of spider

Savignia fronticornis is a species of sheet weaver found in Mediterranean. It was described by Eugène Simon in 1884.
