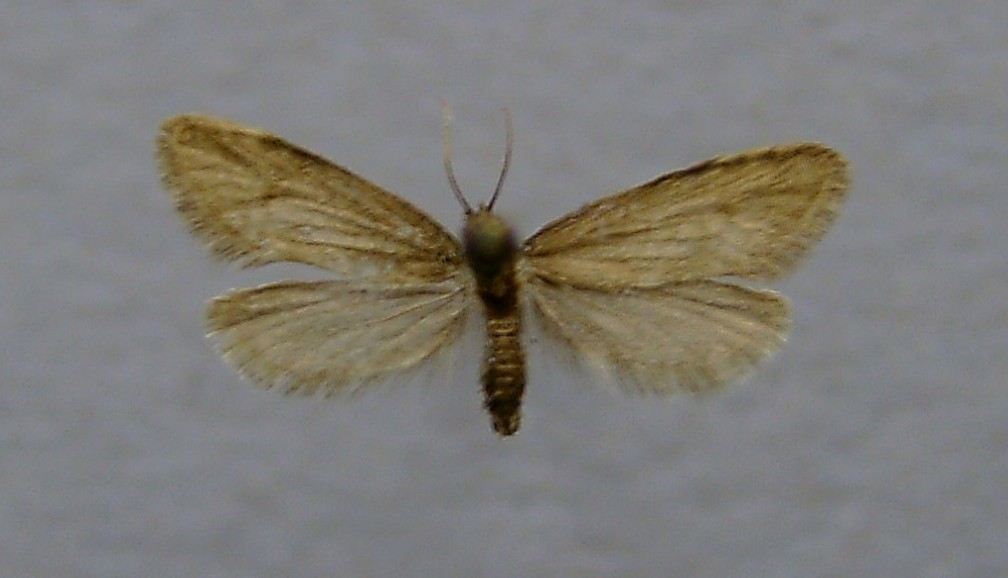
- Adult male T. tubulosa

Scientific classification
- Kingdom: Animalia
- Phylum: Arthropoda
- Clade: Pancrustacea
- Class: Insecta
- Order: Lepidoptera
- Family: Psychidae
- Subfamily: Taleporiinae
- Genus: Taleporia; Hübner, 1825

Synonyms
- Solenobia Duponchel, 1843; Talaeporia (lapsus)

= Taleporia =

Genus of moths

Taleporia is a genus of small moths. It belongs to the bagworm moth family (Psychidae). The "wastebin genus" Solenobia is technically a junior synonym of the present genus, but most of the species formerly placed there actually belong to other genera of subfamilies Taleporiinae and Naryciinae (which is sometimes included in the former).

== Selected species ==
- Taleporia aethiopica
- Taleporia amariensis
- Taleporia anderegella
- Taleporia austriaca
- Taleporia autumnella Rebel, 1919
- Taleporia bavaralta
- Taleporia borealis Wocke, 1862
- Taleporia caucasica
- Taleporia clandestinella
- Taleporia crepusculella
- Taleporia discussa
- Taleporia glabrella
- Taleporia gozmanyi
- Taleporia gramatella
- Taleporia guenei
- Taleporia henderickxi Arnscheid, 2016
- Taleporia hirta
- Taleporia improvisella Staudinger, 1859
- Taleporia isozopha
- Taleporia lefebvriella
- Taleporia mesochlora
- Taleporia minor
- Taleporia minorella
- Taleporia nana
- Taleporia nigropterella
- Taleporia politella (Ochsenheimer, 1816)
- Taleporia pseudobombycella
- Taleporia pseudoimprovisella Witt & de Freina, 1984
- Taleporia sciacta
- Taleporia shosenkyoensis
- Taleporia szocsi
- Taleporia tesserella
- Taleporia triangularis
- Taleporia trichopterella
- Taleporia tubulosa
- Taleporia zopha
