= Hans Henderickx =

Belgian entomologist

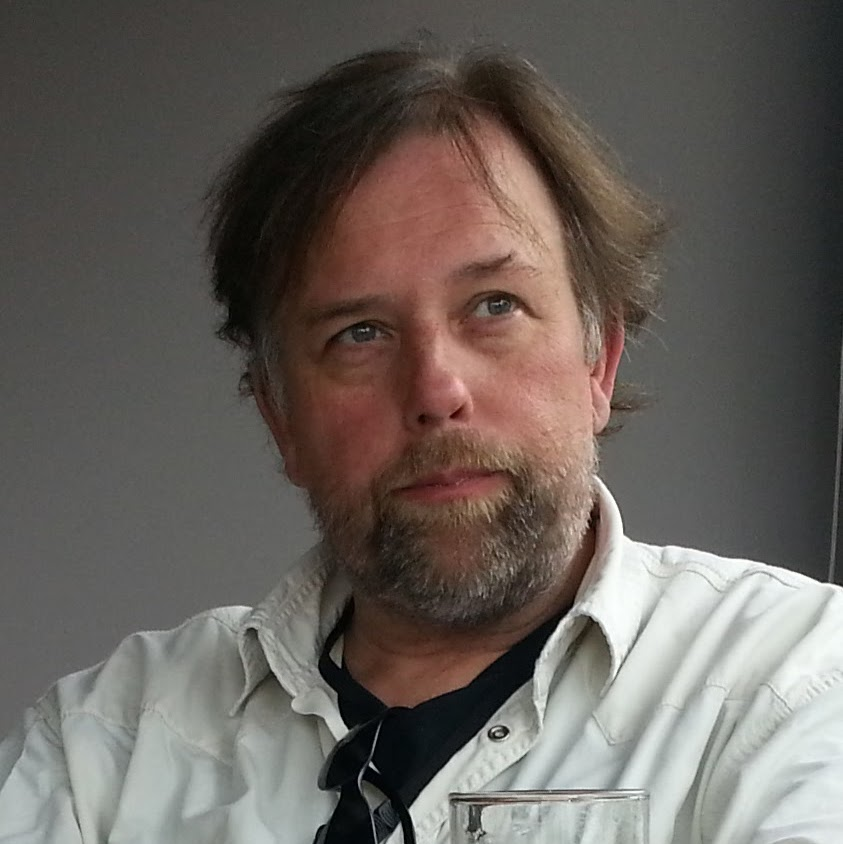
- Entomologist, Mol-BE

Hans Henderickx (1961–2016) was a Belgian entomologist specializing in Invertebrates born in Mol, Belgium.

== Biography ==
He started in 1984 as researcher in the Life Sciences electron microscope department of Janssen Pharmaceutica (Johnson & Johnson). Initially, he trained in the spearheading technologies regarding digital medical imaging. In 2003 he became department manager. Under the guidance of Dr Narcisse Leleup (Brussels, Belgium) he focused on invertebrate morphology and faunistics. He authored 81 publications on invertebrate palaeontology, biospeleology and faunistics, many of them pivoting around his unrivaled skills in micro-photography. He described 25 new species from different invertebrate groups, including some extinct species from fossils. Already in 2006 he published -as first one- a paper describing a new arachnid and its external and internal morphology with the novel application of X-ray micro-CT in opaque amber. As researcher, he remained connected to the University Antwerp and the Royal Belgian Institute of Natural Sciences, until his death in November 2016.

== Taxa named by him ==
- Pseudobankesia keersmaekersi Arnscheid, W. & Henderickx, H., 2016
- Protofeaella peetersae Henderickx, H. & Boone, M., 2016
- Feaella (Tetrafeaella) groehni Henderickx 2014
- Eocenoxenos palintropos Henderickx & Bosselaers 2013
- Palaeogrosphus jacquesi Lourenço & Henderickx, 2012
- Pseudogarypus synchrotron Henderickx, 2012
- Allochernes struyvei Henderickx, 2011
- Feaella jocquei Henderickx, 2009
- Roncus elbulli Zaragoza & Henderickx, 2009
- Caenocholax groehni Kathirithamby & Henderickx, 2008
- Pseudogarypus pangaea Henderickx, 2006
- Geogarypus gorskii Henderickx, 2005
- Palaeospinobuthus cenozoicus Lourenco & Henderickx, 2005
- Allochernes deceuninckorum, Henderickx & Vets 2003
- Savignia naniplopi Bosselaers & Henderickx 2002
- Larca bosselaersi Henderickx 2002
- Pseudobankesia aphroditae Weidlich & Henderickx 2002
- Neobisium epirensis Henderickx & Vets 2000
- Neobisium schawalleri Henderickx 2000
- Eudarcia verkerki Gaedike & Henderickx, 1999
- Pseudobankesia hauseriella Henderickx, 1998
- Lasiochernes cretonatus Henderickx 1998
- Chthonius minotaurus Henderickx 1997
- Pseudobankesia leleupiella Henderickx 1996
- Eudarcia atlantica Henderickx 1995

== Taxa named after him ==
- Bosselaers, J., 1998: nl:Nesticus henderickxi (Araneae, Nesticidae), a new blind troglobitic spider from Crete., in Bull. Br. Arachnol. Soc. 11(1): 9–14.
- Gaedike, R. & Karsholt, O., 2001: Contribution to the Lepidoptera fauna of the Madeira Islands. Part 2. Tineidae, Acrolepiidae, Epermeniidae. — Beiträge zur Entomologie 51 (1): 161–213. (nl:Monopis henderickxi).
- Judson, M.L.I., 2003 – Baltic amber pseudoscorpions (Arachnida, Chelonethi): a new species of Neobisium (Neobisiidae) and the status of Obisium rathkii Koch & Berendt. Geodiversitas 25, vol 3 : 445-450 (Neobisium henderickxi fr:Neobisium)
- Lourenço, W. 2009. A new sub-fossil scorpion of the genus Microcharmus Lourenço, 1995 from Malagasy copal (Scorpiones, Microcharmidae). Boletin Sociedad Entomologica Aragonesa 44: 135–137. (nl:Microcharmus henderickxi) (https://paleobiodb.org/classic/checkTaxonInfo?taxon_no=287006)
- Bosselaers, J. 2012. Two interesting new ground spiders (Araneae) from the Canary Islands and Greece." SERKET 13(1/2): 83–90. (fr:Zelotes (genre))
- Hlavac, P., Skuhrovec, J., 2016. Endogean and cavernicolous Coleoptera of the Balkans. XV. A new species of the genus Ioniorhynchus Magrini, Meoli & Abbazzi, 2005 (Coleoptera: Curculionidae: Entiminae) from Greece. ZOOTAXA 4092 (1): 129–138. (nl:Ioniorhynchus henderickxi) (https://species.wikimedia.org/wiki/Template:Hlav%C3%A1%C4%8D_%26_Skuhrovec,_2016)
- Arnscheid, W.R., 2016 Taleporia henderickxi sp.n., a new psychid species of the subfamily Taleporiinae from Crete (Lepidoptera, Psychidae). NOTA LEPID.

== Publications (selection) ==
Full list of publications

- Wilfried R. Arnscheid, Hans Henderickx, 2016, Pseudobankesia keersmaekersi sp. n., a new species from Greece (Lepidoptera, Psychidae, Taleporiinae)
- Christophoryova, J.F., Frisova, Krajcovicova, K., Henderickx, H., Spaniel, S., 2016: Morphometric study of three rare European species of the genus Lasiochernes Beier, 1932 (Pseudoscorpones, Chernetidae) (in press in Zootaxa)
- Henderickx, H. & Boone, M., 2016. The basal pseudoscorpion family Feaellidae Ellingsen, 1906 walks the earth for 98.000.000 years: a new fossil genus has been found in Cretaceous Burmese amber (Pseudoscorpiones: Feaellidae). ENTOMO-INFO 27(1) (Protofeaella peetersae)
- Henderickx, H & Boone, M. 2014. The First fossil Feaella Ellingsen 1906, representing an unexpected pseudoscorpion family in Baltic amber (Pseudoscorpiones, Feaellidae). ENTOMO-INFO 25 (1): 5–11.
- Henderickx, H., Bosselaers, J., Pauwels, E., Van Hoorebeke, L., Boone, M. 2013. X-ray micro-CT reconstruction reveals eight antennomeres in a new fossil taxon that constitutes a sister clade to Dundoxenos and Triozocera (Strepsiptera: Corioxenidae). Palaeontologia Electronica Vol. 16, Issue 3: 29A; 16p.
- Stoffelen, E., Henderickx, H., Vercauteren, T., Lock, K., Bosmans, R.., 2013: De water-en oppervlaktewantsen van België. Fauna van België, ISBN 9789073242272. 256pp
- Henderickx, H.A., Tafforeau, P., Soriano C., 2012: Phase-contrast microtomography reveals the morphology of a partially visible new Pseudogarypus in Baltic amber (Pseudoscorpiones: Pseudogarypidae). In PALAEONTOLOGIA ELECTRONICA Vol. 15 (2, 17a): 1–11.
- Henderickx, H.A., 2009: A new Feaella species (Pseudoscorpiones: Feaellidae) from Kenya., in PHEGEA 37(2)(1 juni 2009): 41–47.
- Juan A. Zaragoza, J.A.., Henderickx, H.A., 2009: Roncus elbulli (Arachnida, Pseudoscorpiones), a new species from Cap de Creus Nature Park (Catalonia, Spain), with a key to the Spanish species of the genus Roncus., in ZOOKEYS 8: 19-34
- Henderickx, H., 2007: Overzicht van de Strepsiptera in België met vermelding van een nieuwe inheemse soort: Halictophagus silwoodensis Waloff 1981: Phegea 35(4): 141–143.
- Henderickx, H., Cnudde, V., Masschaele, B., Dierick, M., Vlassenbroeck, J., Van Hoorebeke, L., 2006: Description of a new fossil Pseudogarypus (Pseudoscorpiones: Pseudogarypidae) with the use of X-ray micro-CT to penetrate opaque amber. ZOOTAXA 1305: 41–50.
- Henderickx, H. & Zaragoza, J.A., 2005: Notes on Roncus (Pseudoscorpiones: Neobisiidae) from the Eastern Pyrenees: new synonymy and description of a new species. Revista Ibérica de Arachnologia 11: 47–59.
- Henderickx, H., Vets, V., 2003. A new myrmecophylous Allochernes (Arachnida: Pseudoscorpiones: Chernetidae) from Catalunya, Spain. In Zootaxa 366: 1–10.
- Henderickx, H.A., 2000a. Neobisium (Ommatoblothrus) schawalleri sp. n., a new troglobitic pseudoscorpion from Crete (Arachnida: Pseudoscorpiones: Neobisiidae)., in Phegea 28 (2)(1.VI.2000): 5–10.
- Henderickx, H.A., 1999a. Naamlijst van de Belgische pseudoschorpioenen (Arachnida Pseudoscorpionida)., in Bulletin de la Société Royale Belge d’Entomologie 135 (I-VI): 66–71.
