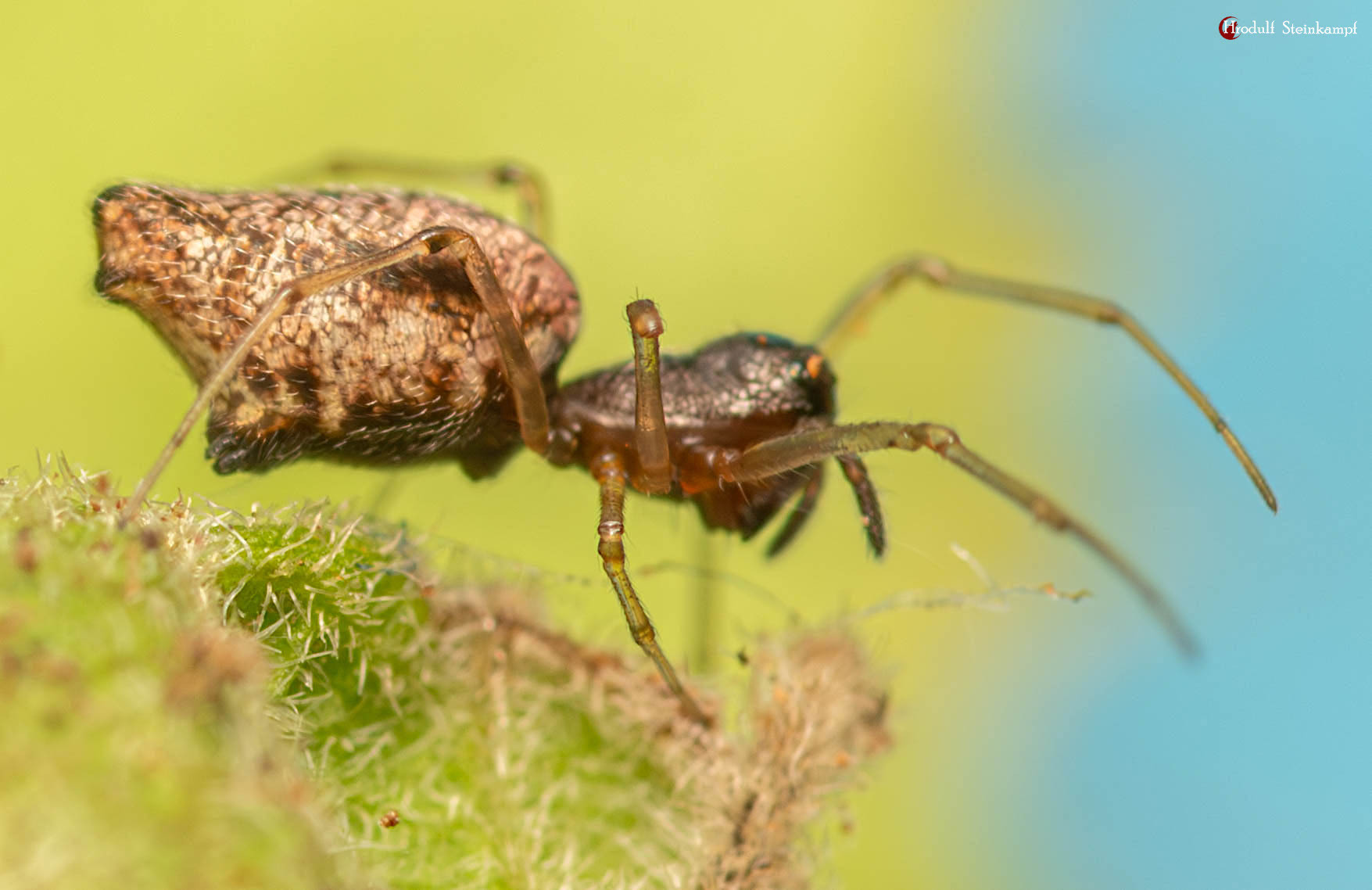
- M. dentipalpis
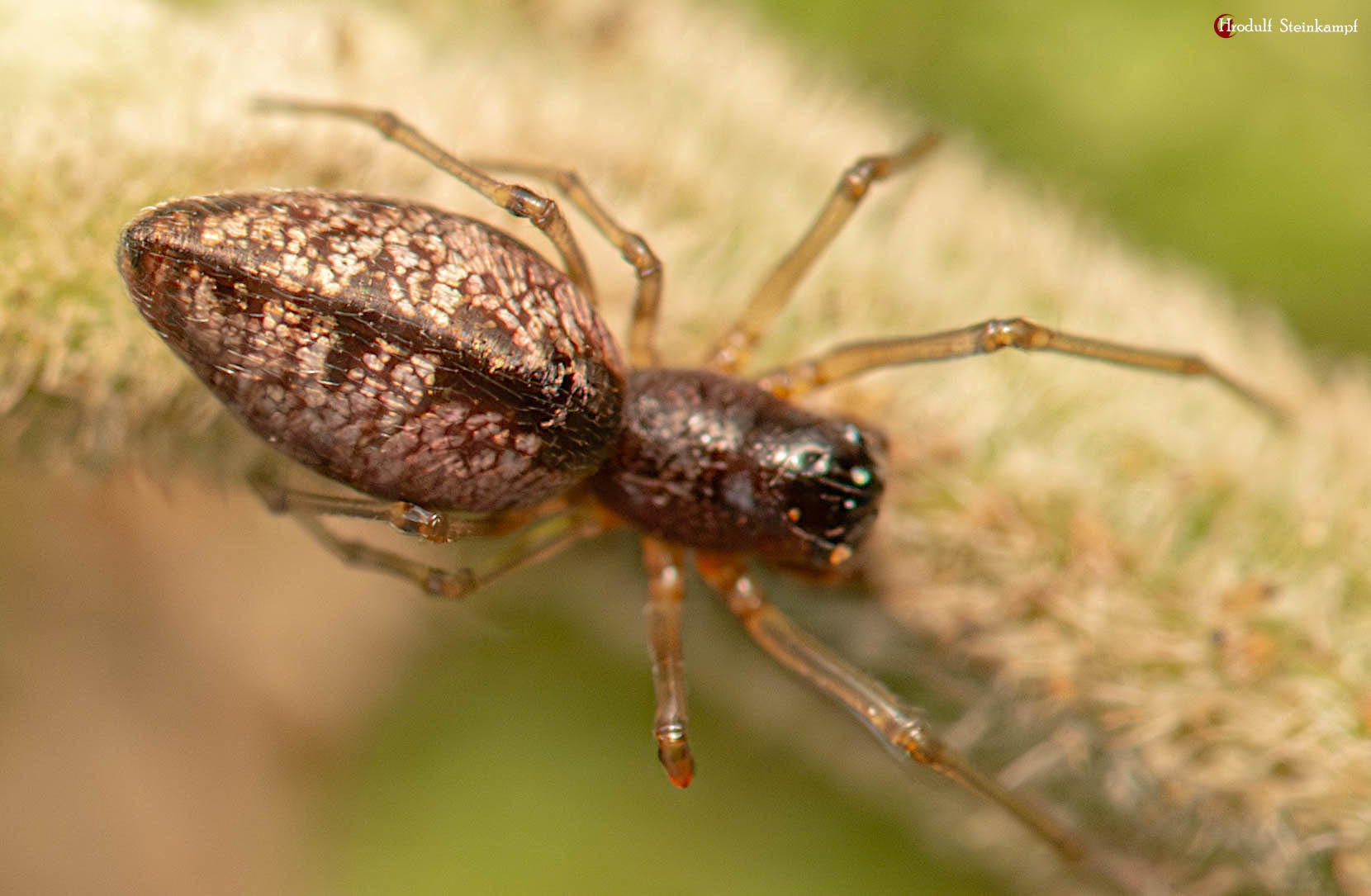
- M. dentipalpis

Scientific classification
- Kingdom: Animalia
- Phylum: Arthropoda
- Subphylum: Chelicerata
- Class: Arachnida
- Order: Araneae
- Infraorder: Araneomorphae
- Family: Linyphiidae
- Genus: Mecynidis; Simon, 1894

Type species
- M. dentipalpis Simon, 1894

Species
- 8, see text

= Mecynidis =

Genus of spiders

Mecynidis is a genus of African dwarf spiders that was first described by Eugène Louis Simon in 1894. Originally placed with the tangle-web spiders, it was moved to the Linyphiidae in 1964.

Its species are found in Angola, Kenya, South Africa, and Tanzania:

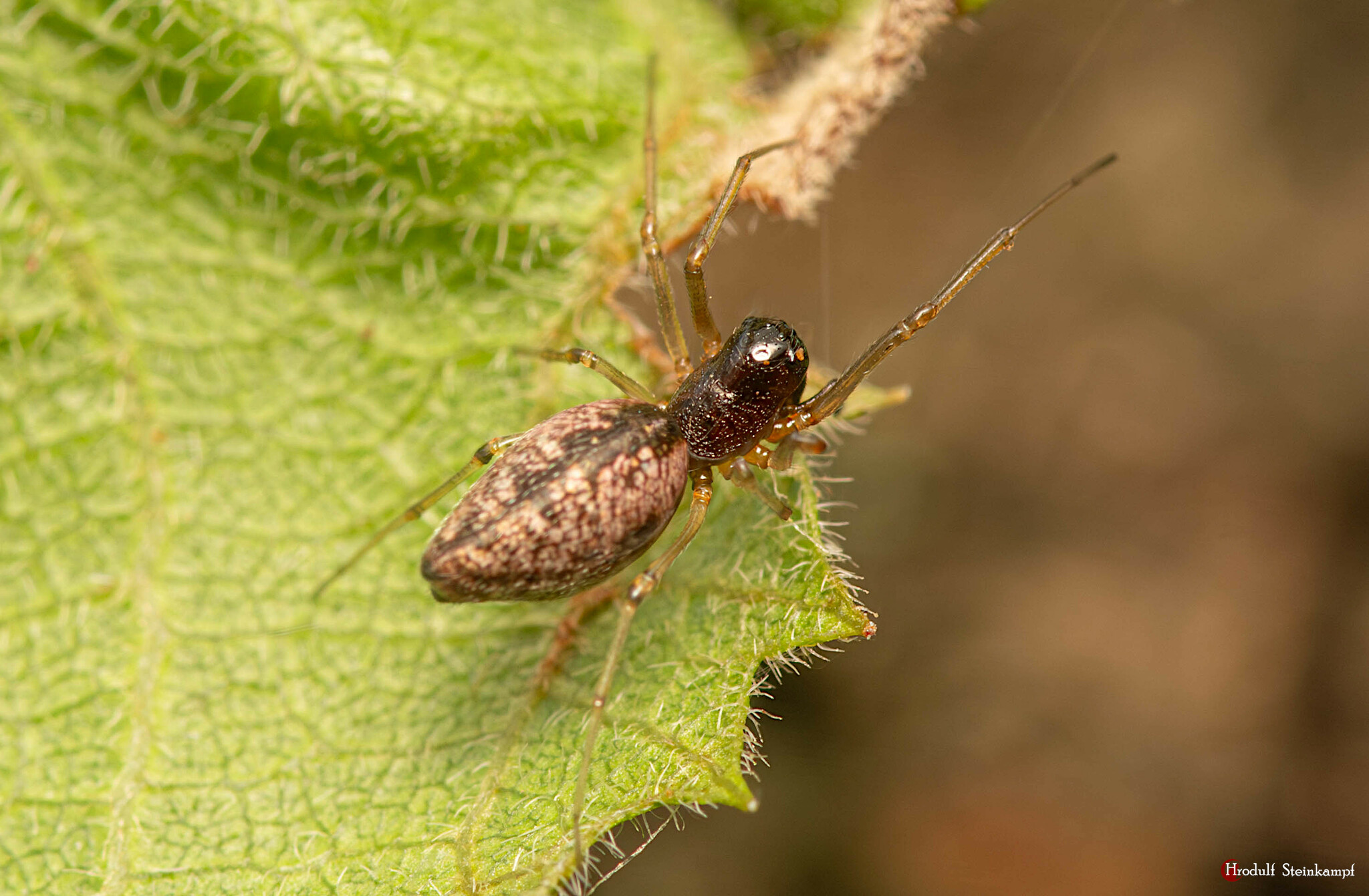
M. dentipalpis

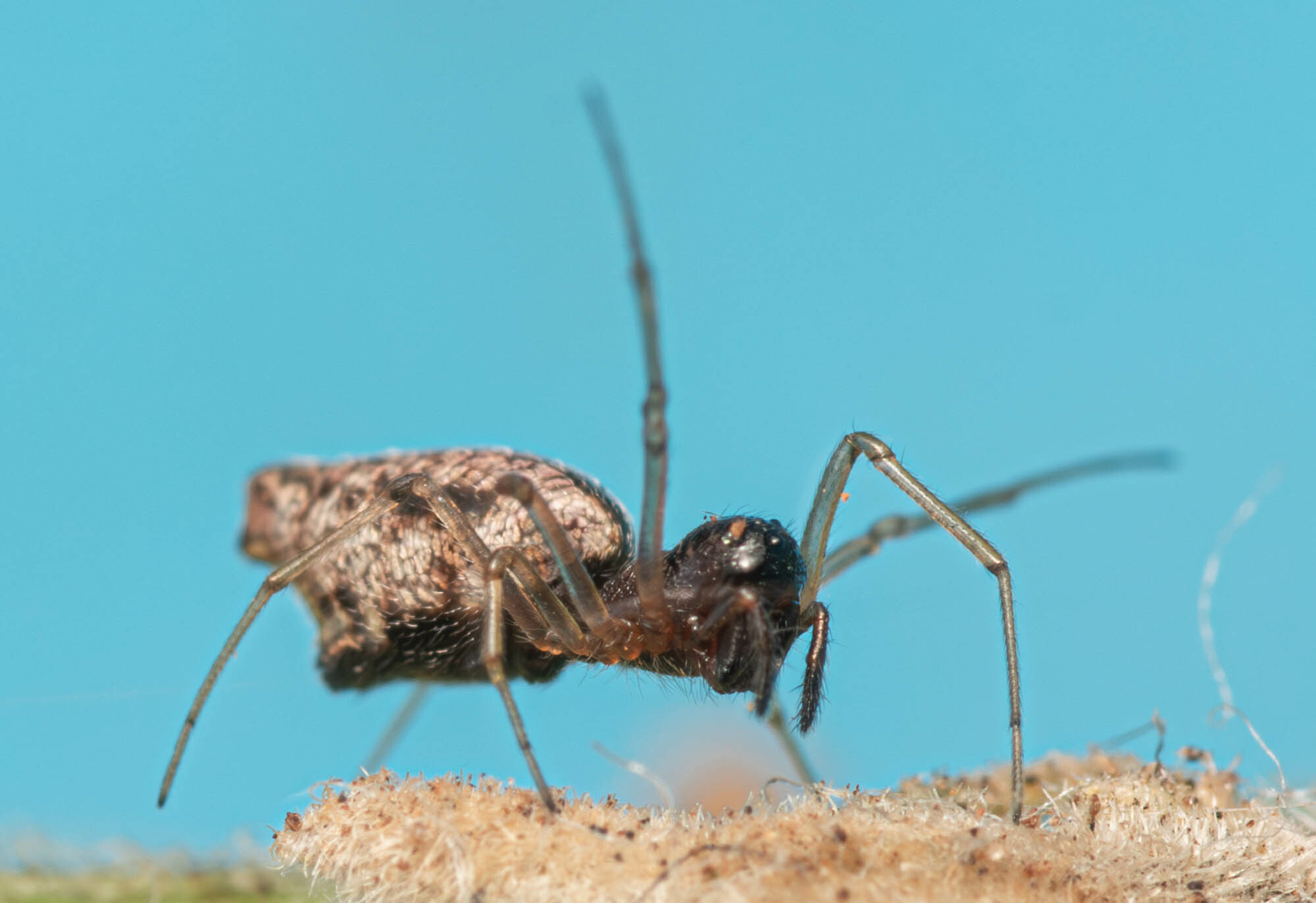
M. dentipalpis

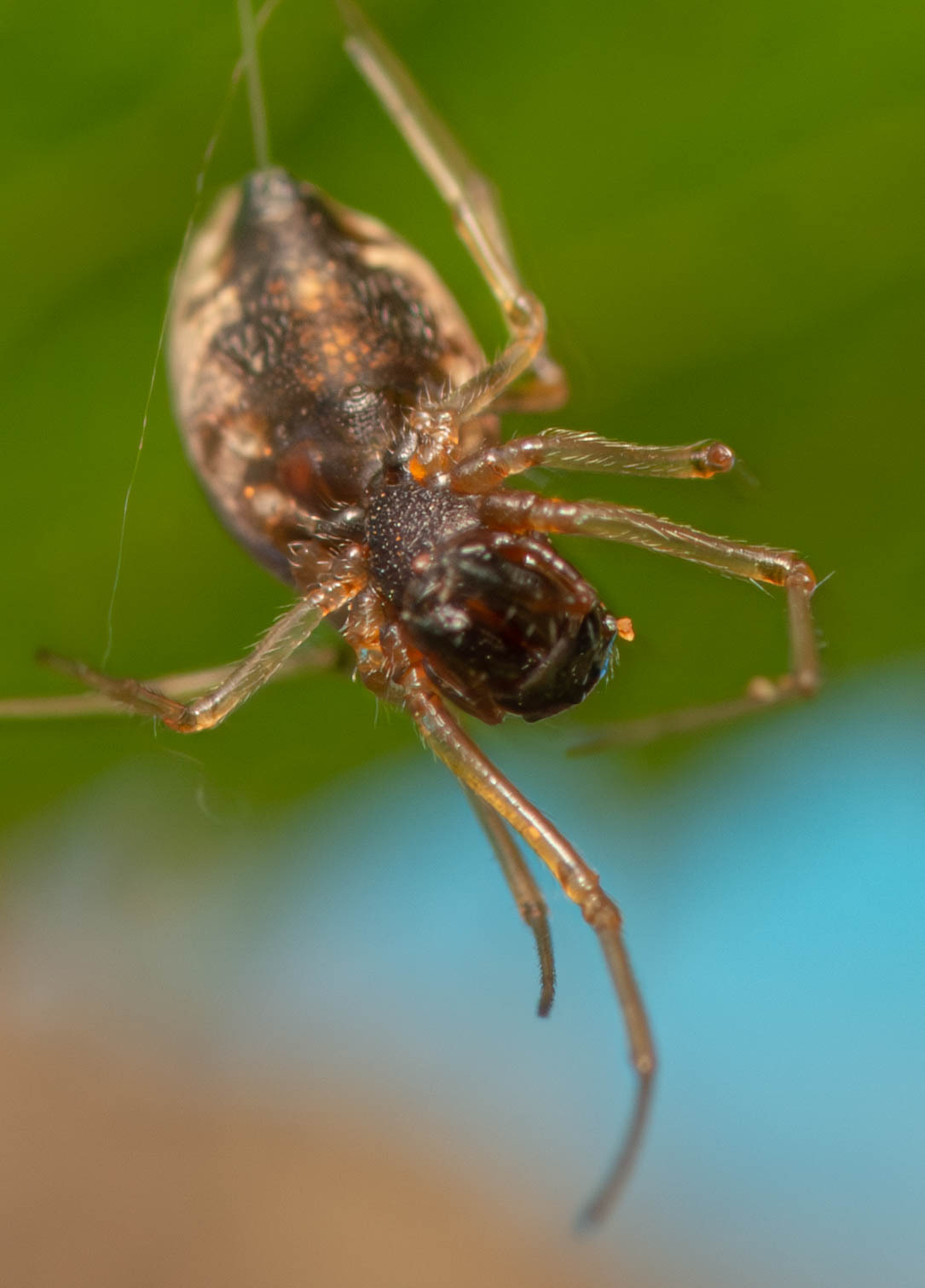
M. dentipalpis

== Species ==
As of October 2025, this genus includes eight species:

- Mecynidis antiqua Jocqué & Scharff, 1986 – Tanzania
- Mecynidis ascia Scharff, 1990 – Tanzania
- Mecynidis bitumida Russell-Smith & Jocqué, 1986 – Kenya
- Mecynidis dentipalpis Simon, 1894 – South Africa (type species)
- Mecynidis laevitarsis Miller, 1970 – Angola
- Mecynidis muthaiga Russell-Smith & Jocqué, 1986 – Kenya
- Mecynidis scutata Jocqué & Scharff, 1986 – Tanzania
- Mecynidis spiralis Jocqué & Scharff, 1986 – Tanzania
