= Millidgea =

Scientific classification
- Kingdom: Animalia
- Phylum: Arthropoda
- Subphylum: Chelicerata
- Class: Arachnida
- Order: Araneae
- Infraorder: Araneomorphae
- Family: Linyphiidae
- Genus: Millidgea; Locket, 1968

Type species
- M. convoluta Locket, 1968

Species
- 3, see text

Genus of spiders

Millidgea is a genus of Central African dwarf spiders that was first described by G. H. Locket in 1968.

== Species ==
As of May 2019 it contains three species:

- Millidgea convoluta Locket, 1968 (type)– Angola
- Millidgea navicula Locket, 1968 – Angola
- Millidgea verrucosa Locket, 1968 – Angola
