= Doenitzius =

Scientific classification
- Kingdom: Animalia
- Phylum: Arthropoda
- Subphylum: Chelicerata
- Class: Arachnida
- Order: Araneae
- Infraorder: Araneomorphae
- Family: Linyphiidae
- Genus: Doenitzius; Oi, 1960

Type species
- D. peniculus Oi, 1960

Species
- D. minutus Seo, 2018 – Korea; D. peniculus Oi, 1960 – Korea, Japan; D. pruvus Oi, 1960 – Russia (Far East), China, Korea, Japan

Genus of spiders

Doenitzius is a genus of Asian dwarf spiders that was first described by R. Oi in 1960. As of May 2021 it contains three species: D. minutus, D. peniculus and D. pruvus.
