= Fusciphantes =

Scientific classification
- Kingdom: Animalia
- Phylum: Arthropoda
- Subphylum: Chelicerata
- Class: Arachnida
- Order: Araneae
- Infraorder: Araneomorphae
- Family: Linyphiidae
- Genus: Fusciphantes; Oi, 1960

Type species
- F. longiscapus Oi, 1960

Species
- 10, see text

Genus of spiders

Fusciphantes is a genus of Asian dwarf spiders that was first described by R. Oi in 1960.

== Species ==
As of May 2019 it contains ten species, found in Japan:

- Fusciphantes enmusubi (Ihara, Nakano & Tomikawa, 2017) – Japan
- Fusciphantes hibanus (Saito, 1992) – Japan
- Fusciphantes iharai (Saito, 1992) – Japan
- Fusciphantes longiscapus Oi, 1960 (type) – Japan
- Fusciphantes nojimai (Ihara, 1995) – Japan
- Fusciphantes occidentalis (Ihara, Nakano & Tomikawa, 2017) – Japan
- Fusciphantes okiensis (Ihara, 1995) – Japan
- Fusciphantes saitoi (Ihara, 1995) – Japan
- Fusciphantes setouchi (Ihara, 1995) – Japan
- Fusciphantes tsurusakii (Ihara, 1995) – Japan
