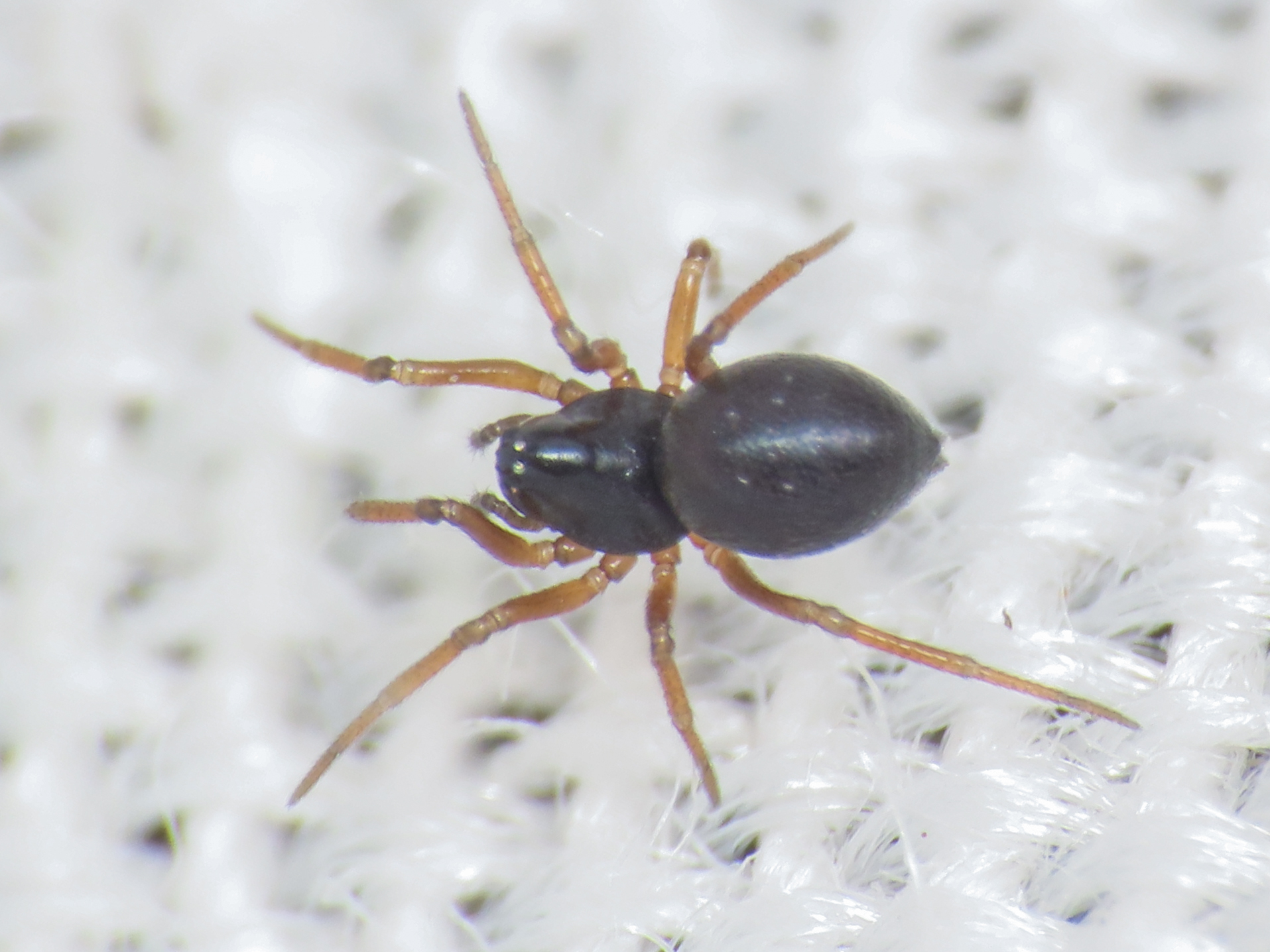
- Minyriolus medusa

Scientific classification
- Kingdom: Animalia
- Phylum: Arthropoda
- Subphylum: Chelicerata
- Class: Arachnida
- Order: Araneae
- Infraorder: Araneomorphae
- Family: Linyphiidae
- Genus: Minyriolus; Simon, 1884

Type species
- M. pusillus (Wider, 1834)

Species
- 4, see text

= Minyriolus =

Genus of spiders

Minyriolus is a genus of dwarf spiders that was first described by Eugène Louis Simon in 1884.

== Species ==
As of May 2019 it contains four species:

- Minyriolus australis Simon, 1902 – Argentina
- Minyriolus medusa (Simon, 1881) – Europe
- Minyriolus phaulobius (Thorell, 1875) – Italy
- Minyriolus pusillus (Wider, 1834) (type) – Europe
