= Napometa =

Scientific classification
- Kingdom: Animalia
- Phylum: Arthropoda
- Subphylum: Chelicerata
- Class: Arachnida
- Order: Araneae
- Infraorder: Araneomorphae
- Family: Linyphiidae
- Genus: Napometa; Benoit, 1977

Type species
- N. sanctaehelenae Benoit, 1977

Species
- 2, see text

Genus of spiders

Napometa is a genus of Atlantic dwarf spiders that was first described by P. L. G. Benoit in 1977.

== Species ==
As of May 2019 it contains two species:

- Napometa sanctaehelenae Benoit, 1977 (type) – St. Helena
- Napometa trifididens (O. Pickard-Cambridge, 1873) – St. Helena
