= Carorita =

Scientific classification
- Kingdom: Animalia
- Phylum: Arthropoda
- Subphylum: Chelicerata
- Class: Arachnida
- Order: Araneae
- Infraorder: Araneomorphae
- Family: Linyphiidae
- Genus: Carorita; Duffey & Merrett, 1963

Type species
- C. limnaea (Crosby & Bishop, 1927)

Species
- C. limnaea (Crosby & Bishop, 1927) – North America, Western, Central and Northern Europe, Russia (Europe to Far East), China; C. sibirica Tanasevitch, 2007 – Russia (West Siberia, Far East)

Genus of spiders

Carorita is a genus of dwarf spiders that was first described by E. Duffey & P. Merrett in 1963. As of May 2019 it contained only two species: C. limnaea and C. sibirica.
