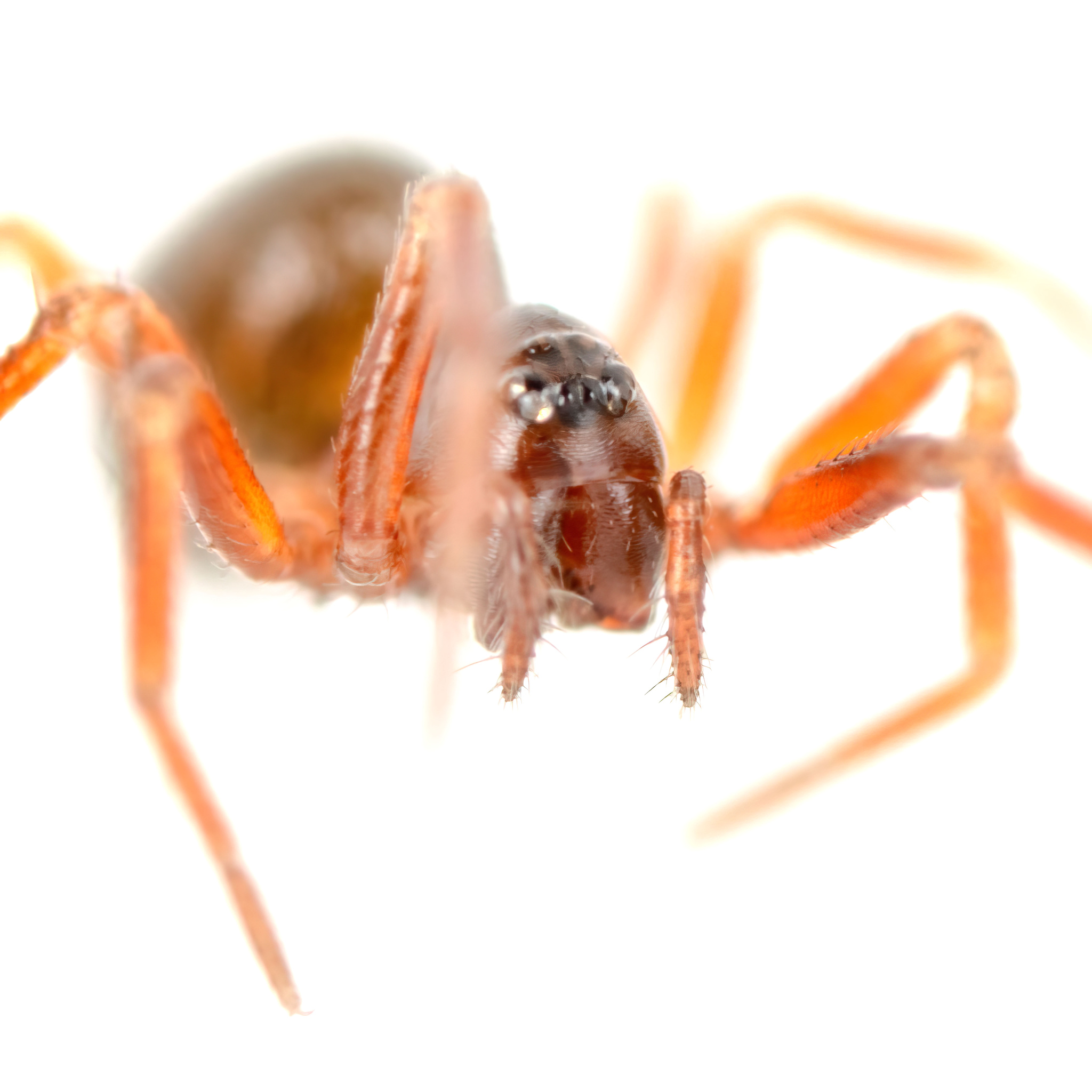
- Thyreosthenius parasiticus

Scientific classification
- Kingdom: Animalia
- Phylum: Arthropoda
- Subphylum: Chelicerata
- Class: Arachnida
- Order: Araneae
- Infraorder: Araneomorphae
- Family: Linyphiidae
- Genus: Thyreosthenius; Simon, 1884

Type species
- T. biovatus (O. Pickard-Cambridge, 1875)

Species
- 2, see text

Synonyms
- Hormathion Crosby & Bishop, 1933

= Thyreosthenius =

Genus of spiders

Thyreosthenius is a genus of sheet weavers that was first described by Eugène Louis Simon in 1884.

== Species ==
As of May 2019 it contains only two species.

- Thyreosthenius biovatus (O. Pickard-Cambridge, 1875) – Europe, Russia (Europe to Far North East)
- Thyreosthenius parasiticus (Westring, 1851) – North America, Europe, Caucasus, Russia (Europe to Far East)
