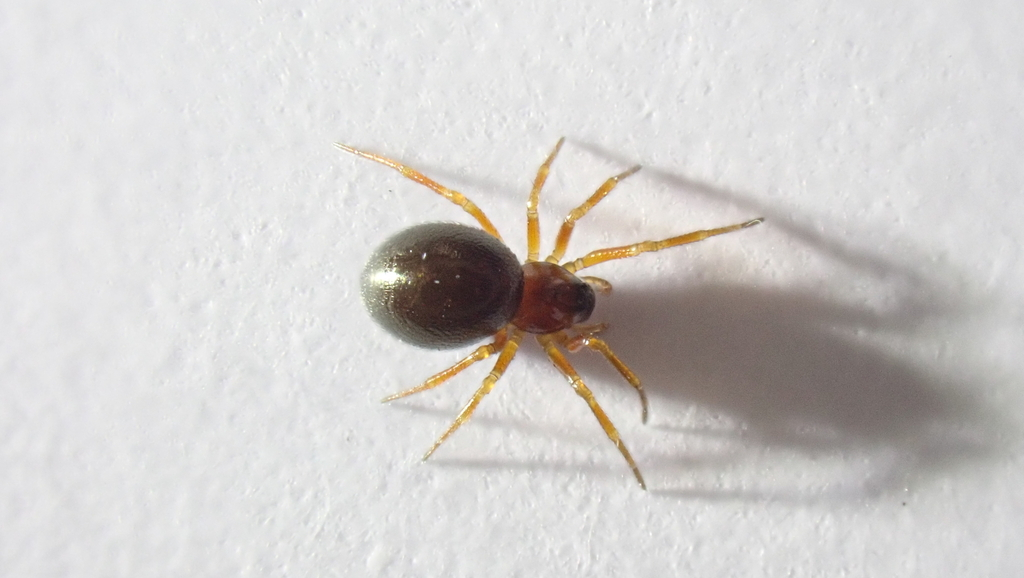
- Hybocoptus corrugis

Scientific classification
- Kingdom: Animalia
- Phylum: Arthropoda
- Subphylum: Chelicerata
- Class: Arachnida
- Order: Araneae
- Infraorder: Araneomorphae
- Family: Linyphiidae
- Genus: Hybocoptus; Simon, 1884

Type species
- H. corrugis (O. Pickard-Cambridge, 1875)

Species
- H. corrugis (O. Pickard-Cambridge, 1875) – Western Europe, Algeria, Morocco; H. dubius Denis, 1950 – France; H. ericicola (Simon, 1881) – France, Algeria

= Hybocoptus =

Genus of spiders

Hybocoptus is a genus of dwarf spiders that was first described by Eugène Louis Simon in 1884. As of May 2019 it contains only three species, found in Algeria, France, and Morocco: H. corrugis, H. dubius, and H. ericicola.
