= Caracladus =

Scientific classification
- Kingdom: Animalia
- Phylum: Arthropoda
- Subphylum: Chelicerata
- Class: Arachnida
- Order: Araneae
- Infraorder: Araneomorphae
- Family: Linyphiidae
- Genus: Caracladus; Simon, 1884

Type species
- C. avicula (L. Koch, 1869)

Species
- 5, see text

Genus of spiders

Caracladus is a genus of dwarf spiders that was first described by Eugène Louis Simon in 1884.

== Species ==
As of May 2019 it contains five species:

- Caracladus avicula (L. Koch, 1869) (type) – France, Switzerland, Germany, Austria, Italy
- Caracladus leberti (Roewer, 1942) – Western, Central Europe
- Caracladus montanus Sha & Zhu, 1994 – China
- Caracladus tsurusakii Saito, 1988 – Japan
- Caracladus zamoniensis Frick & Muff, 2009 – France, Switzerland, Austria
