= Bordea =

Scientific classification
- Kingdom: Animalia
- Phylum: Arthropoda
- Subphylum: Chelicerata
- Class: Arachnida
- Order: Araneae
- Infraorder: Araneomorphae
- Family: Linyphiidae
- Genus: Bordea; Bosmans, 1995

Type species
- B. cavicola (Simon, 1884)

Species
- B. berlandi (Fage, 1931) – Portugal; B. cavicola (Simon, 1884) – Spain, France; B. negrei (Dresco, 1951) – Spain, France

Genus of spiders

Bordea is a genus of European dwarf spiders that was first described by R. Bosmans in 1995. As of May 2019 it contains only three species: B. berlandi, B. cavicola, and B. negrei.
