= Laminafroneta =

Scientific classification
- Kingdom: Animalia
- Phylum: Arthropoda
- Subphylum: Chelicerata
- Class: Arachnida
- Order: Araneae
- Infraorder: Araneomorphae
- Family: Linyphiidae
- Genus: Laminafroneta; Merrett, 2004

Type species
- L. bidentata (Holm, 1968)

Species
- L. bidentata (Holm, 1968) – Congo, Kenya, Rwanda; L. brevistyla (Holm, 1968) – Cameroon, Congo, Kenya, Tanzania; L. locketi (Merrett & Russell-Smith, 1996) – Ethiopia

Genus of spiders

Laminafroneta is a genus of African dwarf spiders that was first described by P. Merrett in 2004. As of May 2019 it contains only three species, found in Cameroon, Middle Africa, Ethiopia, Kenya, Rwanda, and Tanzania: L. bidentata, L. brevistyla, and L. locketi.
