= Theonina =

Scientific classification
- Kingdom: Animalia
- Phylum: Arthropoda
- Subphylum: Chelicerata
- Class: Arachnida
- Order: Araneae
- Infraorder: Araneomorphae
- Family: Linyphiidae
- Genus: Theonina; Simon, 1929

Type species
- T. cornix (Simon, 1881)

Species
- 5, see text

Genus of spiders

Theonina is a genus of sheet weavers that was first described by Eugène Louis Simon in 1929.

== Species ==
As of August 2021 it contains five species.

- Theonina canaan Tanasevitch, 2020 – Israel
- Theonina cornix (Simon, 1881) (type) – Europe, North Africa
- Theonina kratochvili Miller & Weiss, 1979 – Central Europe to Greece and Ukraine, Russia (Europe, Caucasus)
- Theonina laguncula (Denis, 1937) – Morocco, Algeria, Spain, Cyprus
- Theonina linyphioides (Denis, 1937) – Algeria
