= Hubertella =

Scientific classification
- Kingdom: Animalia
- Phylum: Arthropoda
- Subphylum: Chelicerata
- Class: Arachnida
- Order: Araneae
- Infraorder: Araneomorphae
- Family: Linyphiidae
- Genus: Hubertella; Platnick, 1989

Type species
- H. orientalis (Georgescu, 1977)

Species
- H. montana Tanasevitch, 2019 – Nepal; H. orientalis (Georgescu, 1977) – Nepal; H. thankurensis (Wunderlich, 1983) – Nepal

Genus of spiders

Hubertella is a genus of Asian dwarf spiders that was first described by Norman I. Platnick in 1989. As of May 2019 it contains only three species, found in Nepal: H. montana, H. orientalis, and H. thankurensis.
