= Trachyneta =

Scientific classification
- Kingdom: Animalia
- Phylum: Arthropoda
- Subphylum: Chelicerata
- Class: Arachnida
- Order: Araneae
- Infraorder: Araneomorphae
- Family: Linyphiidae
- Genus: Trachyneta; Holm, 1968

Type species
- T. extensa Holm, 1968

Species
- 2, see text

Genus of spiders

Trachyneta is a genus of African sheet weavers that was first described by Å. Holm in 1968.

== Species ==
As of June 2019 it contains only two species.

- Trachyneta extensa Holm, 1968 – Congo
- Trachyneta jocquei Merrett, 2004 – Malawi
