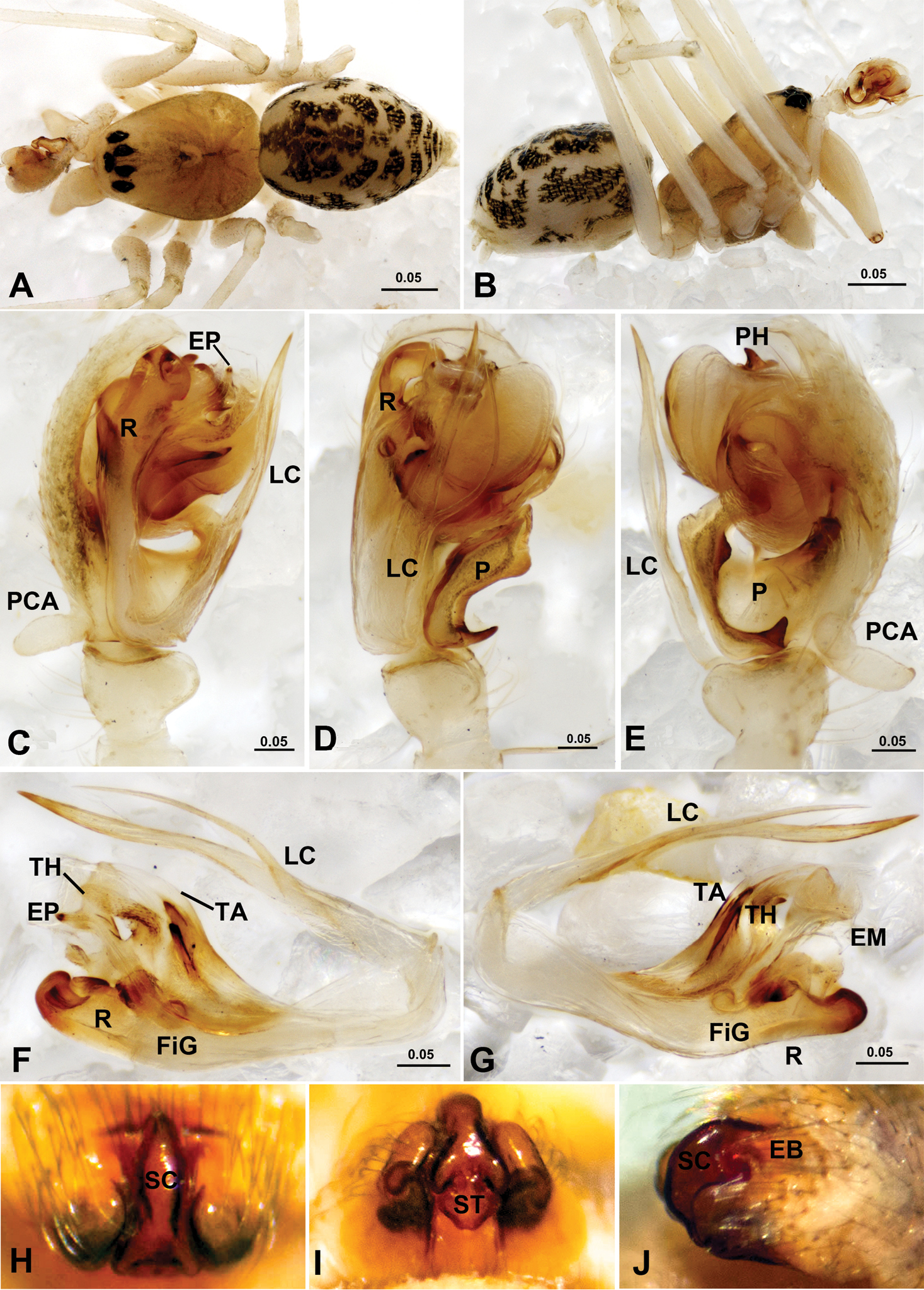
- A. agressa and A. dokutchaevi

Scientific classification
- Kingdom: Animalia
- Phylum: Arthropoda
- Subphylum: Chelicerata
- Class: Arachnida
- Order: Araneae
- Infraorder: Araneomorphae
- Family: Linyphiidae
- Genus: Acanthoneta; Marusik

Species
- Acanthoneta aggressa (Chamberlin & Ivie, 1943); Acanthoneta dokutchaevi (Eskov & Marusik, 1994); Acanthoneta furcata (Emerton, 1913)

= Acanthoneta =

Genus of spiders

Acanthoneta is a genus of sheet weavers first described by Eskov & Marusik in 1992. As of February 2019, it contains only three species, found in China, Russia, and North America.
