= Oilinyphioides =

Scientific classification
- Kingdom: Animalia
- Phylum: Arthropoda
- Subphylum: Chelicerata
- Class: Arachnida
- Order: Araneae
- Infraorder: Araneomorphae
- Family: Linyphiidae
- Genus: Oilinyphioides; Irfan, Zhang & Peng, 2025
- Species: O. triangularis

Binomial name
- Oilinyphioides triangularis Irfan, Zhang & Peng, 2025

Species of spider

Oilinyphioides is a monotypic genus of spiders in the family Linyphiidae containing the single species, Oilinyphioides triangularis.

== Distribution ==
Oilinyphioides triangularis has been recorded from Chongqing and Hunan Province of China.

== Etymology ==
The genus name is a combination of Oilinyphia Ono & Saito, 1989 and -oides "resembling", indicating the similarity between the two genera.

The specific name indicates the triangular distal arm of the paracymbium in the male.
