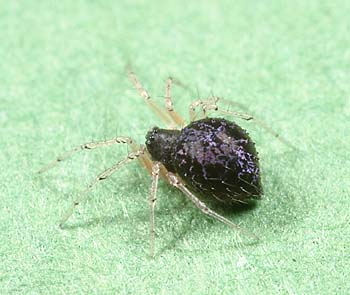
- O. peculiaris, female

Scientific classification
- Kingdom: Animalia
- Phylum: Arthropoda
- Subphylum: Chelicerata
- Class: Arachnida
- Order: Araneae
- Infraorder: Araneomorphae
- Family: Linyphiidae
- Genus: Oilinyphia; Ono & Saito, 1989

Type species
- O. peculiaris Ono & Saito, 1989

Species
- 3, see text

= Oilinyphia =

Genus of spiders

Oilinyphia is a genus of Asian dwarf spiders that was first described by H. Ono & H. Saito in 1989.

== Species ==
As of May 2019 it contains three species:

- Oilinyphia hengji Zhao & Li, 2014 – China
- Oilinyphia jadbounorum Ponksee & Tanikawa, 2010 – Thailand
- Oilinyphia peculiaris Ono & Saito, 1989 (type) – Japan (Ryukyu Is.)
