= Metaleptyphantes =

Scientific classification
- Kingdom: Animalia
- Phylum: Arthropoda
- Subphylum: Chelicerata
- Class: Arachnida
- Order: Araneae
- Infraorder: Araneomorphae
- Family: Linyphiidae
- Genus: Metaleptyphantes; Locket, 1968

Type species
- M. machadoi Locket, 1968

Species
- 18, see text

Genus of spiders

Metaleptyphantes is an African genus of dwarf spiders that was first described by G. H. Locket in 1968.

== Species ==
As of October 2025, this genus includes eighteen species:

- Metaleptyphantes bifoliatus Locket, 1968 – Angola
- Metaleptyphantes cameroonensis Bosmans, 1986 – Cameroon
- Metaleptyphantes carinatus Locket, 1968 – Angola
- Metaleptyphantes clavator Locket, 1968 – DR Congo, Angola, Kenya, Tanzania
- Metaleptyphantes dentiferens Bosmans, 1979 – Kenya
- Metaleptyphantes dubius Locket & Russell-Smith, 1980 – Nigeria
- Metaleptyphantes familiaris Jocqué, 1984 – South Africa
- Metaleptyphantes foulfouldei Bosmans, 1986 – Cameroon
- Metaleptyphantes kraepelini (Simon, 1905) – Indonesia (Java)
- Metaleptyphantes machadoi Locket, 1968 – Cameroon, Nigeria, Gabon, Angola, Uganda, Tanzania (type species)
- Metaleptyphantes ovatus Scharff, 1990 – Tanzania
- Metaleptyphantes perexiguus (Simon & Fage, 1922) – Africa, Comoros
- Metaleptyphantes praecipuus Locket, 1968 – Angola, Seychelles
- Metaleptyphantes subclavator Tanasevitch, 2025 – Ethiopia
- Metaleptyphantes triangulatus Holm, 1968 – Congo
- Metaleptyphantes uncinatus Holm, 1968 – Congo
- Metaleptyphantes vates Jocqué, 1983 – Gabon
- Metaleptyphantes vicinus Locket, 1968 – Kenya, Angola
