= Pocobletus =

Scientific classification
- Kingdom: Animalia
- Phylum: Arthropoda
- Subphylum: Chelicerata
- Class: Arachnida
- Order: Araneae
- Infraorder: Araneomorphae
- Family: Linyphiidae
- Genus: Pocobletus; Simon, 1894

Type species
- P. coroniger Simon, 1894

Species
- 13, see text

Genus of spiders

Pocobletus is a genus of sheet weavers that was first described by Eugène Louis Simon in 1894.

== Species ==
As of January 2022 it contains thirteen species:

- Pocobletus bivittatus Simon, 1898 – St. Vincent
- Pocobletus conspicuus (Millidge, 1991) – Peru, Brazil
- Pocobletus coroniger Simon, 1894 (type) – USA, Mexico, Nicaragua, Costa Rica, Panama, Venezuela
- Pocobletus eberhardi (Rodrigues, Lemos & Brescovit, 2013) – Brazil
- Pocobletus girotii (Lemos & Brescovit, 2013) – Brazil
- Pocobletus medonho (Lemos & Brescovit, 2013) – Brazil
- Pocobletus nogueirai (Lemos & Brescovit, 2013) – Brazil
- Pocobletus pallidus (Millidge, 1991) – Venezuela
- Pocobletus phoenix (Lemos & Brescovit, 2013) – Brazil
- Pocobletus proba (Millidge, 1991) – Bolivia
- Pocobletus ribeiroi (Lemos & Brescovit, 2013) – Brazil
- Pocobletus una (Lemos & Brescovit, 2013) – Brazil
- Pocobletus versicolor (Millidge, 1991) – Colombia, Ecuador
