= Notioscopus =

Scientific classification
- Kingdom: Animalia
- Phylum: Arthropoda
- Subphylum: Chelicerata
- Class: Arachnida
- Order: Araneae
- Infraorder: Araneomorphae
- Family: Linyphiidae
- Genus: Notioscopus; Simon, 1884

Type species
- N. sarcinatus (O. Pickard-Cambridge, 1873)

Species
- 3, see text

Genus of spiders

Notioscopus is a genus of dwarf spiders that was first described by Eugène Louis Simon in 1884.

== Species ==
As of October 2025, this genus includes three species:

- Notioscopus australis Simon, 1894 – South Africa
- Notioscopus sarcinatus (O. Pickard-Cambridge, 1873) – Europe, Russia (Europe to Middle Siberia) (type species)
- Notioscopus sibiricus Tanasevitch, 2007 – Russia (Middle Siberia to Far East), Mongolia, China
