= Antrohyphantes =

Scientific classification
- Kingdom: Animalia
- Phylum: Arthropoda
- Subphylum: Chelicerata
- Class: Arachnida
- Order: Araneae
- Infraorder: Araneomorphae
- Family: Linyphiidae
- Genus: Antrohyphantes; Dumitrescu, 1971

Type species
- A. rhodopensis (Drensky, 1931)

Species
- A. balcanicus (Drensky, 1931) – Bulgaria; A. rhodopensis (Drensky, 1931) – Eastern Europe; A. sophianus (Drensky, 1931) – Bulgaria

Genus of spiders

Antrohyphantes is a genus of dwarf spiders that was first described by M. Dumitrescu in 1971. As of May 2019 it contains only three species: A. balcanicus, A. rhodopensis, and A. sophianus.
