= Asperthorax =

Scientific classification
- Kingdom: Animalia
- Phylum: Arthropoda
- Subphylum: Chelicerata
- Class: Arachnida
- Order: Araneae
- Infraorder: Araneomorphae
- Family: Linyphiidae
- Genus: Asperthorax; Oi, 1960

Type species
- A. communis Oi, 1960

Species
- A. borealis Ono & Saito, 2001 – Russia (Far East), Japan; A. communis Oi, 1960 – Russia (Far East), Japan; A. granularis Gao & Zhu, 1989 – China

Genus of spiders

Asperthorax is a genus of Asian dwarf spiders that was first described by R. Oi in 1960. As of May 2019 it contains only three species: A. borealis, A. communis, and A. granularis.
