= Mioxena =

Scientific classification
- Kingdom: Animalia
- Phylum: Arthropoda
- Subphylum: Chelicerata
- Class: Arachnida
- Order: Araneae
- Infraorder: Araneomorphae
- Family: Linyphiidae
- Genus: Mioxena; Simon, 1926

Type species
- M. blanda (Simon, 1884)

Species
- 3, see text

Genus of spiders

Mioxena is a genus of dwarf spiders that was first described by Eugène Louis Simon in 1926.

== Species ==
As of May 2019 it contains three species:

- Mioxena blanda (Simon, 1884) (type) – Europe
- Mioxena celisi Holm, 1968 – Congo, Kenya
- Mioxena longispinosa Miller, 1970 – Angola
