= Oreocyba =

Scientific classification
- Kingdom: Animalia
- Phylum: Arthropoda
- Subphylum: Chelicerata
- Class: Arachnida
- Order: Araneae
- Infraorder: Araneomorphae
- Family: Linyphiidae
- Genus: Oreocyba; Holm, 1962

Type species
- O. elgonensis (Fage, 1936)

Species
- 2, see text

Genus of spiders

Oreocyba is a genus of East African dwarf spiders that was first described by Å. Holm in 1962.

== Species ==
As of May 2019 it contains two species:

- Oreocyba elgonensis (Fage, 1936) (type) – Kenya, Uganda
- Oreocyba propinqua Holm, 1962 – Kenya, Uganda
