= Emertongone =

Scientific classification
- Kingdom: Animalia
- Phylum: Arthropoda
- Subphylum: Chelicerata
- Class: Arachnida
- Order: Araneae
- Infraorder: Araneomorphae
- Family: Linyphiidae
- Genus: Emertongone; Lin, Lopardo & Uhl, 2022
- Species: E. montifer

Binomial name
- Emertongone montifer (Emerton, 1882)

Species of spider

Emertongone is a monotypic genus of dwarf spiders containing the single species, Emertongone montifer. The genus was created by Lin, Lopardo & Uhl in 2022 for the species formerly known as Oedothorax montifer and first described in 1882 as Lophocarenum montiferum. It has only been found in the United States.
