= Donacochara =

Scientific classification
- Kingdom: Animalia
- Phylum: Arthropoda
- Subphylum: Chelicerata
- Class: Arachnida
- Order: Araneae
- Infraorder: Araneomorphae
- Family: Linyphiidae
- Genus: Donacochara; Simon, 1884

Type species
- D. speciosa (Thorell, 1875)

Species
- D. deminuta Locket, 1968 – Angola; D. speciosa (Thorell, 1875) – Europe to Central Asia

Genus of spiders

Donacochara is a genus of dwarf spiders that was first described by Eugène Louis Simon in 1884. As of May 2019 it contains only two species: D. deminuta and D. speciosa.
