= Chenisides =

Scientific classification
- Kingdom: Animalia
- Phylum: Arthropoda
- Subphylum: Chelicerata
- Class: Arachnida
- Order: Araneae
- Infraorder: Araneomorphae
- Family: Linyphiidae
- Genus: Chenisides; Denis, 1962

Type species
- C. bispinigera Denis, 1962

Species
- C. bispinigera Denis, 1962 – Congo; C. monospina Russell-Smith & Jocqué, 1986 – Kenya

Genus of spiders

Chenisides is a genus of African dwarf spiders that was first described by J. Denis in 1962. As of May 2019 it contains only two species: C. bispinigera and C. monospina.
