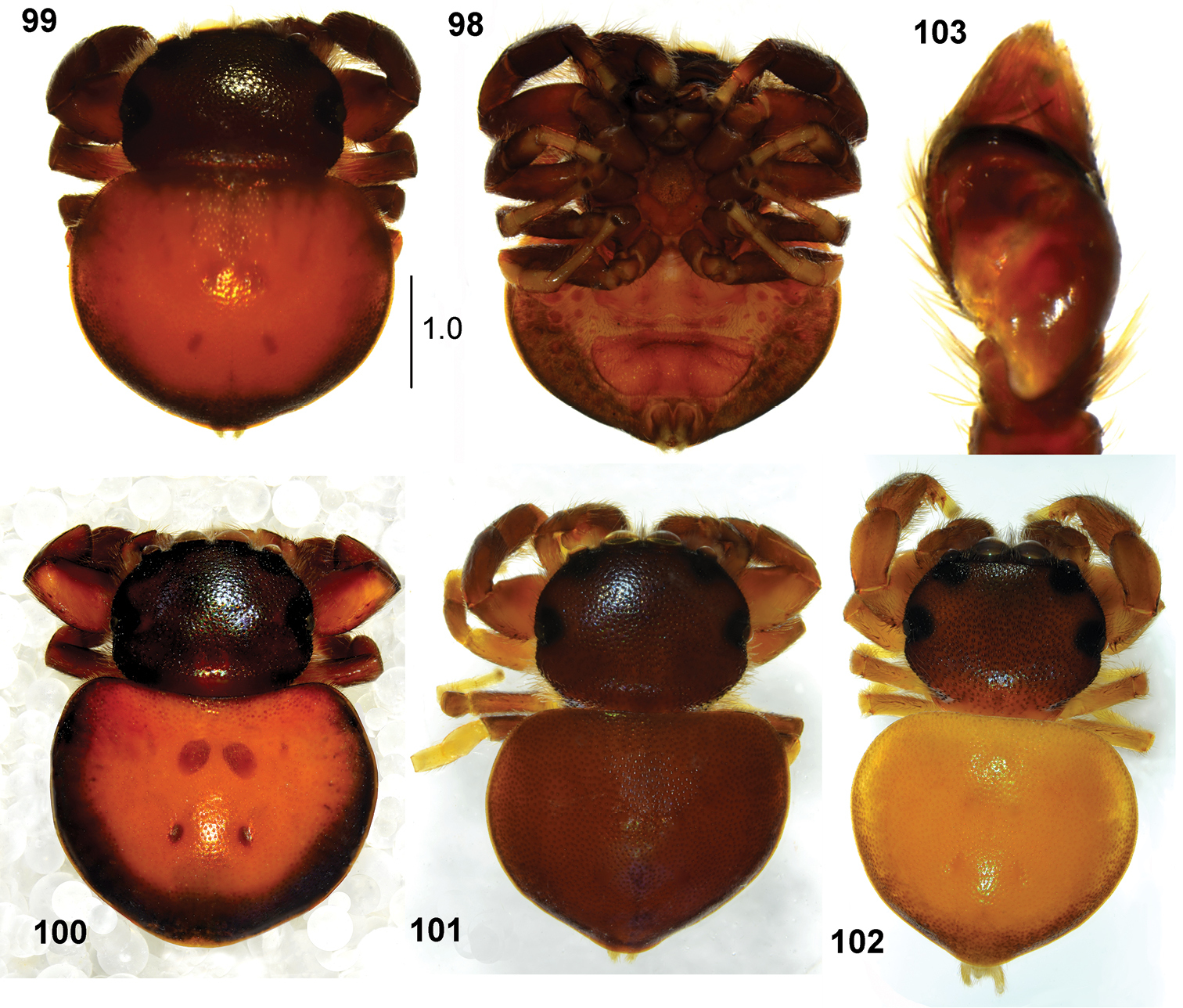
- Views from above and below of male spiders from Congo

Scientific classification
- Kingdom: Animalia
- Phylum: Arthropoda
- Subphylum: Chelicerata
- Class: Arachnida
- Order: Araneae
- Infraorder: Araneomorphae
- Family: Salticidae
- Genus: Pachyballus
- Species: P. transversus

Binomial name
- Pachyballus transversus Simon, 1900

= Pachyballus transversus =

Species of jumping spider

Pachyballus transversus is a species of jumping spider that lives in Africa. A member of the genus Pachyballus, the spider is small, with a dark brown or blackish cephalothorax, or forward section, that is from 1.4 to 1.7 mm long and, behind that, an abdomen that is between 2.4 and 2.9 mm long. Its abdomen is orange-brownish with a blackish edge, yellowish or brown on top and brown underneath. Immature spiders have two distinctive oval hard plates, or scuta on the top of their abdomen, which resemble the hardened forewing, or elytra, of beetles. Combined with the beetle-like shape of the spider and its habitat, living on branches in savanna, in rainforests and in plains, the spider mimics beetles, particularly of the Coccinellidae family. This is a form of camouflage. It is also similar to the related Pachyballus flavipes, although it is generally larger. The female was first described in 1900 by the arachnologist Eugène Simon, the male not being described until 120 years later.

== Taxonomy ==
Pachyballus transversus is a species of jumping spider, a member of the family Salticidae, that was first described by the French arachnologist Eugène Simon in 1900. He named it as the type species for the genus Pachyballus, first circumscribed at the same time. Initially, he only described the female and it was not until 2020 that the male was described by Wanda Wesołowska, Galina Azarkina and Konrad Wiśniewski. The holotype is stored in the National Collection of Arachnida at the Plant Protection Research Institute in Pretoria. When he first established the genus, Simon assigned Pachyballus to the Balleae group alongside the related genus Peplometus.

In their 2003 phylogenetic analysis, Wayne Maddison and Marshall Hedin noted that the genus is closely related to Mantisatta, despite the large physiological differences between them, and the similarity of those spiders with a group of genera they termed Marpissoida. In 2004, Suresh Benjamin tentatively included it in the genus, along with Ballus, in his subfamily Ballinae. In 2007, Wesołowska and Anthony van Harten noted the similarity of the genus with Planiemen. In 2015, Maddison listed the genus within the tribe Ballini, derived from Simon's original name, but attributed to an earlier author, Nathan Banks, from 1892. He allocated the tribe to the clade Marpissoida in the clade Salticoida. It is likely that the ballines diverged from the wider Marpissoida clade between 20 and 25 million years ago, although Daniela Andriamalala estimated the family to be 3.99 million years old. In 2016, Jerzy Prószyński added the genus to a group of genera termed Ballines, which contains many of the same genera, including Ballus, Peplometus and Planiemen.

== Description ==
Small and very flat with a strongly pitted exterior, Pachyballus transversus is similar to others in the genus, although slightly larger than the related Pachyballus flavipes. Both the male and female are similar in shape. Their bodies are divided into two main parts, a cephalothorax to the front and, behind that, an abdomen. The male has a cephalothorax that measures between 1.5 and 1.7 mm (0.06 and 0.07 in) in length and between 1.9 and 2 mm (0.07 and 0.08 in) in width. The female has a cephalothorax measuring between 1.4 and 1.6 mm (0.055 and 0.063 in) in length and 1.6 and 2.0 mm in width. The spider's carapace, the hard upper part of the cephalothorax, is wide and dark brown to blackish. It has a trapezoidal eye field, more noticeably than in others in the genus, so much so that the eye field is twice as wide at the line of the last row of eyes as at the first. There are a few hairs and long bristles around some of it eyes. Its sternum, the underside of the cephalothorax, is rounded and darker than the upper side. The part of its face known as its clypeus is low. The spider's chelicerae have three short teeth at the front and a single tooth with serrated edges and four tips at the back. Its other mouthparts are brown.

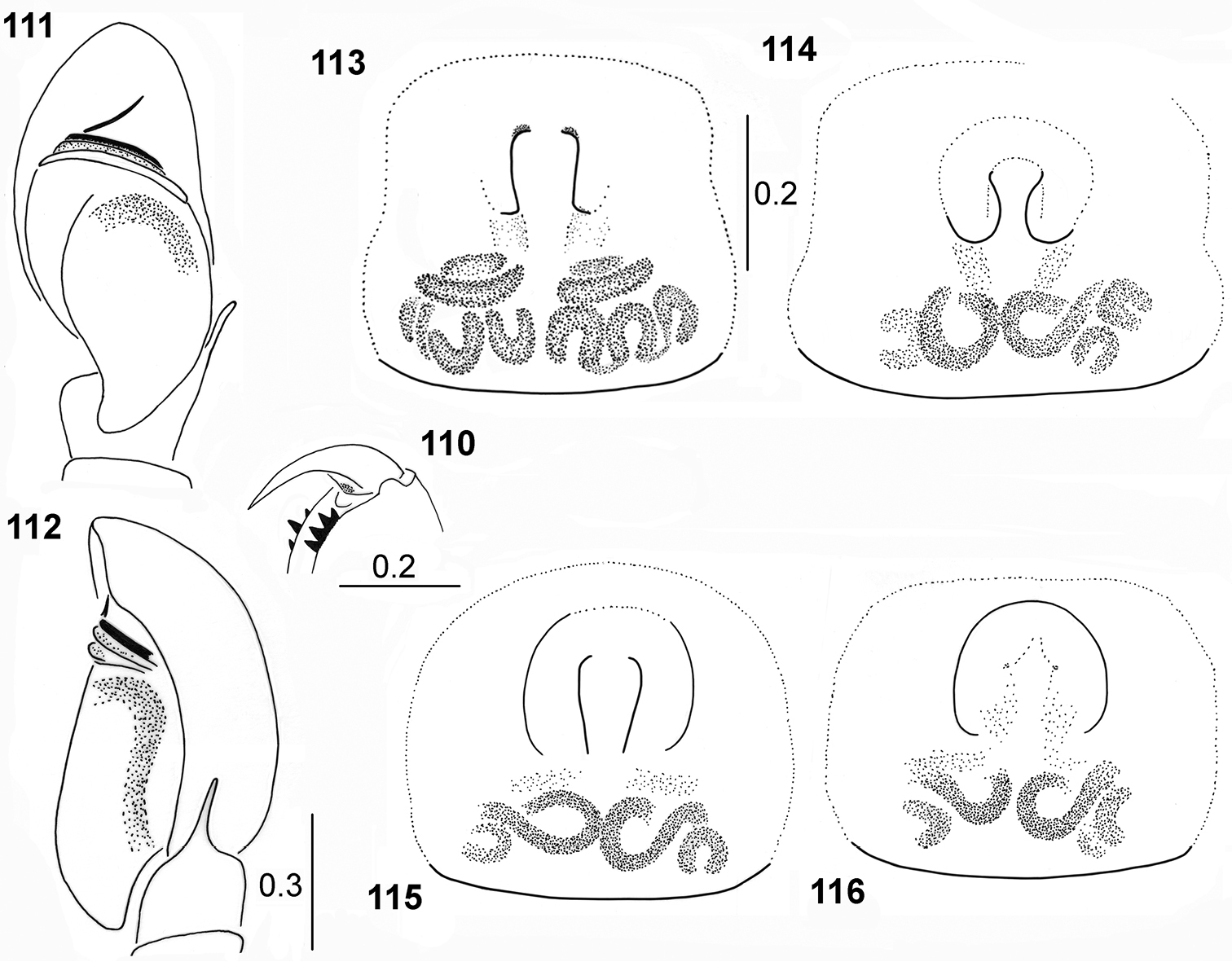
Drawings representing the copulatory organs of P. transversus: 11–112 palpal organ; 113–116 epigyne

Both the male and female have an abdomen that is larger than their cephalothorax, measuring between 2.4 and 2.9 mm (0.09 and 0.11 in) in length and between2.8 and 3.2 mm (0.11 and 0.13 in) in width. The spider's abdomen is generally wider than it is long and usually lighter than its carapace. The male's are heart-shaped and the female's rounded. Its upper side is either orange-brownish with a blackish edge, yellowish or brown and its underside is brown. There is a noticeable hard plate or scutum on its underside and markings on the top. Immature specimens of the spider are characterised by lacking the scuta on the underside and having two oval scuta on the top. The female's legs are all yellow. The first pair of the male's legs is brown and larger than the others. The remainder of its legs are mainly brownish, with lighter areas.

Pachyballus transversus has distinctive copulatory organs. The male's palp finishes with a relatively small palpal tibia that has a single large spike, or tibial apophysis, projecting upwards. The apophysis curves slightly away from the rest of the palp. At the end of the tibia is an oval, semi-circular cymbium attached to a palpal bulb that is similar in size but hangs down alongside the tibia. The bulb has a pronounced bulge at the bottom and a thin projection called an embolus extending from its top, which wraps itself in tight coils before projecting away from the bulb and curving in towards the cymbium. The female spider's epigyne, or external and most visible part of the female copulatory organs, is oval with a horseshoe-shaped depression to the front. There are two copulatory openings that lead via long looping insemination ducts to relatively small receptacles, or spermathecae. The spermathecae show signs of sclerotization.

The spider resembles a beetle. It particularly resembles members of the Coccinellidae family. The shape of the scuta in juveniles is particularly similar to that of the hardened forewings, or elytra, of beetles. Combined with its choice of habitat, this suggests that this is a form of camouflage.

== Distribution and habitat ==
Pachyballus spiders are generally found in Africa and have been recorded in Yemen. Pachyballus transversus was initially seen in Congo, South Africa, and Zanzibar. It has been subsequently identified as having a wide distribution across Africa. The spider has been found in Cameroon, both the Democratic Republic of Congo and Republic of Congo, Ethiopia, Guinea-Bissau, Ivory Coast, Mozambique, Somalia, South Africa and Tanzania. It has been seen living on branches in savanna, in rainforests and in plains at an altitude of 1,100 m (3,600 ft) above sea level. The spider can also live in areas where humans have affected the ecosystem, including coffee plantations and shrubs where the savanna has been overgrazed. Its conservation status is of Least Concern.
