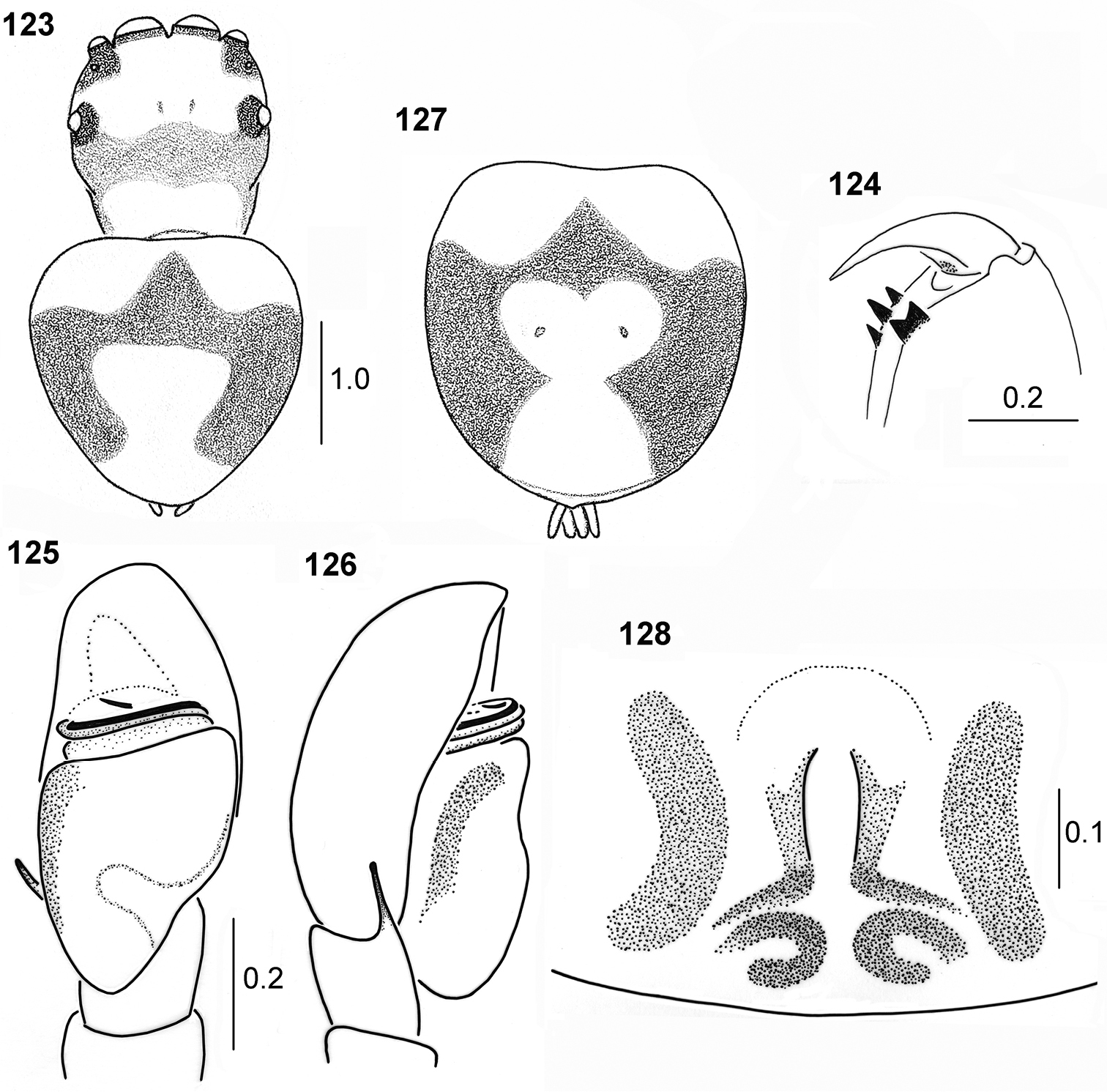
- Detail of a male (123), its teeth (124) and copulatory organs (125, 126) and a female abdomen (127), and epigyne (128)

Scientific classification
- Kingdom: Animalia
- Phylum: Arthropoda
- Subphylum: Chelicerata
- Class: Arachnida
- Order: Araneae
- Infraorder: Araneomorphae
- Family: Salticidae
- Genus: Pachyballus
- Species: P. variegatus

Binomial name
- Pachyballus variegatus Lessert, 1925

= Pachyballus variegatus =

Species of jumping spider

Pachyballus variegatus is a species of jumping spider that lives in Tanzania. It was first described in 1925 and, initially tentatively, allocated to the genus Pachyballus. It is between 2.8 and 2.9 mm (0.11 and 0.11 in) long, the female being larger than the male, with a large heart-shaped abdomen that is between 1.8 mm (0.07 in) and 2.2 mm (0.09 in) long. It is generally black apart from the underside of its abdomen, which is fawn-coloured, brown pedipalp, yellow spinnerets and short dark yellow legs. There is a pattern on its cephalothorax, the front section that overlaps with its abdomen, made of orange-fawn spots. On its abdomen is a pattern of spots; on the female one of these is shaped like an hourglass. This pattern is distinctive. It can also be differentiated from other species in the genus by the lack of a hard plate, or scutum, on its abdomen.

== Taxonomy ==
Pachyballus variegatus is a species of jumping spider, a member of the family Salticidae, that was first described by the arachnologist Roger de Lessert in 1925. He allocated it to the genus Pachyballus, which Eugène Simon had first circumscribed in 1900. He was tentative in this allocation, adding a question mark to the genus. The holotype is stored in the Natural History Museum of Geneva in Switzerland.

When he first established the genus, Simon assigned Pachyballus to the Balleae group alongside the related genus Peplometus. In their 2003 phylogenetic analysis, Wayne Maddison and Marshall Hedin noted that the genus is closely related to Mantisatta, despite the large physiological differences between them, and the similarity of those spiders with a group of genera they termed Marpissoida. In 2004, Suresh Benjamin tentatively included it in the genus, along with Ballus, in his subfamily Ballinae. In 2007, Wesołowska and Anthony van Harten noted the similarity of the genus with Planiemen. In 2015, Maddison listed the genus within the tribe Ballini, derived from Simon's original name, but attributed to an earlier author, Nathan Banks from 1892. Marrison allocated the tribe to the clade Marpissoida in the clade Salticoida. It is likely that the ballines diverged from the wider Marpissoida clade between 20 and 25 million years ago, although Daniela Andriamalala estimated the family to be 3.99 million years old. In 2016, Jerzy Prószyński added the genus to a group of genera termed Ballines, which contains many of the same genera, including Ballus, Peplometus and Planiemen.

== Description ==
Pachyballus variegatus has a shape that is typical of the genus, which resembles a beetle. Like other members of the genus, its body divided into two main parts, a rounded cephalothorax to the front and, behind that, a larger heart-shaped abdomen. Unlike other members of the genus, it has no scutum covering much of its upper surface of its abdomen. It has been confused with young female Pachyballus ornatus, especially just after the latter has moulted. The male and female are similar in their colouration. It has a smooth black cephalothorax that is pitted and marked with an orange-fawn spot in the middle and an orange-fawn area at the very back, the latter covered by the front of its abdomen.

The female has a typical body length of 2.9 mm (0.11 in). It has a cephalothorax that is typically 1.5 mm (0.06 in) long, 1.4 mm (0.06 in) wide and 0.5 mm (0.02 in) high. Its abdomen is larger, measuring 2.1 mm (0.08 in) in length and 2.2 mm (0.09 in) in width. Its eye field is yellowish-orange with blackish rings around its eyes. The part of underside of its cephalothorax known as the sternum is light brown. It has tall chelicerae with two teeth to the front and three behind, two of the latter fused together. Its abdomen is black on top with an orange-fawn spot on its surface that narrows towards the rear and, behind that, one that is hourglass shaped. Its underside is fawn-coloured.

The male is smaller than the female, with a typical body length of 2.8 mm (0.11 in). It has a cephalothorax that is typically 1.4 mm long, 1.3 mm (0.05 in) wide and 0.4 mm (0.02 in) high. Although still smaller than the female, its abdomen is also larger than its cephalothorax, measuring 1.8 mm (0.07 in) in length and 1.7 mm (0.07 in) in width. There are also delicate hairs near its eyes. Its chelicerae are brown and have two teeth at the front, similar to the female, but has a single tooth with two tips at the back. Its remaining mouthparts, its labium and maxillae, are brownish with lighter tips. Its abdomen has a distinctive pattern with the front portion bright and the rear dark and marked with a light patch in the middle.

Pachyballus variegatus has short yellow spinnerets and short dark yellow legs. It has distinctive copulatory organs. The female's epigyne, or external and most visible part of the female copulatory organs, shows slight signs of sclerotization. It has a shallow depression in the middle and copulatory openings that lead to relatively large receptacles, or spermathecae. The male has a single brown pedipalp. Its tibia is shorter than its patella and finishes a small sharp spine-like spike called a tibial apophysis. At the end of the tibia, there is a large rounded cymbium and a lumpy palpal bulb. The top of the bulb is flat and is topped with a thin projection called an embolus that wraps itself in three tight wide coils.

== Distribution and habitat ==
Pachyballus spiders generally are generally found in Africa and have been recorded in Yemen. Pachyballus variegatus is endemic to Tanzania. It lives on cultivated land, having been first found in Kibonoto near Mount Kilimanjaro. It has only been recorded in that local area.
