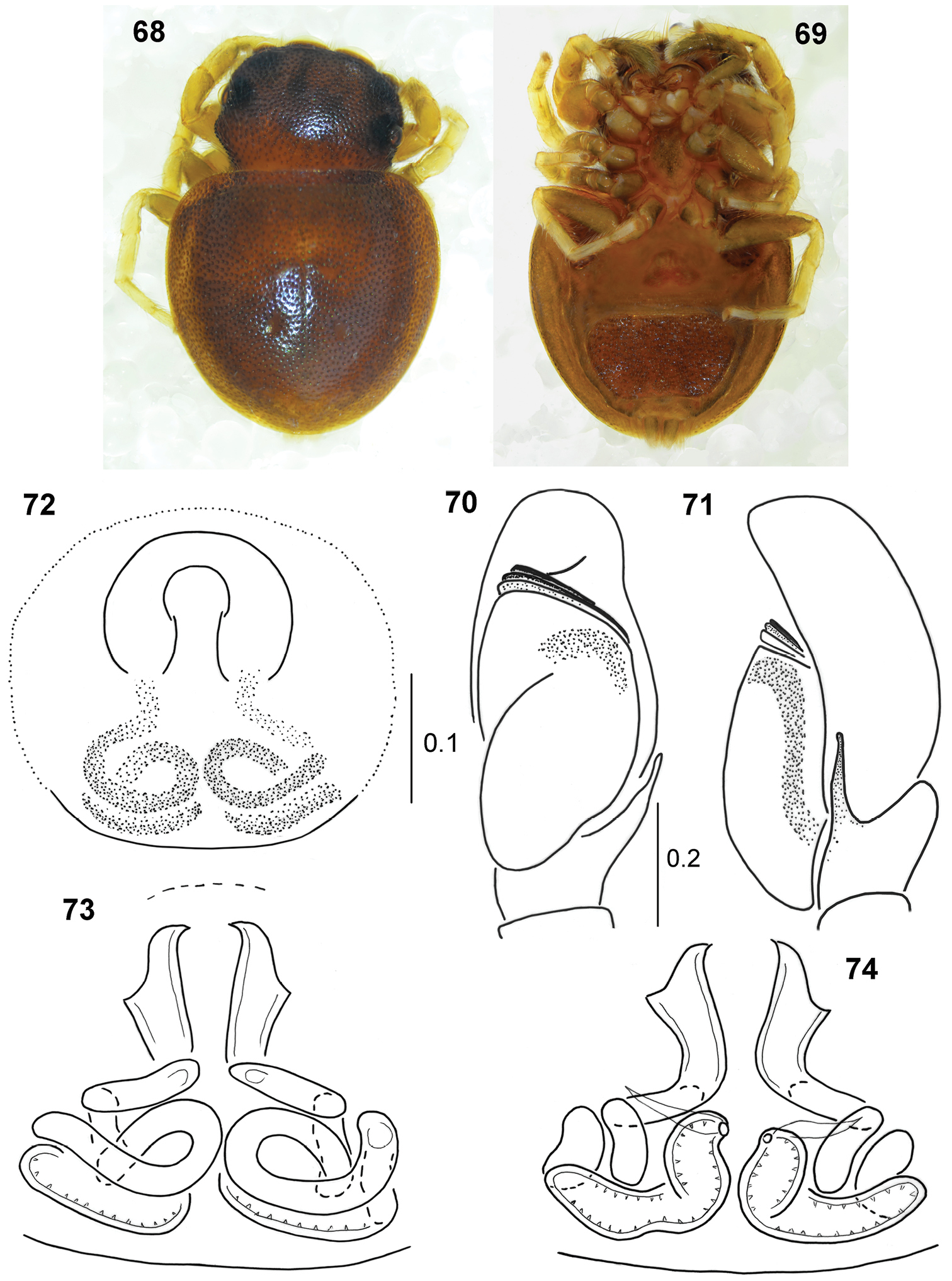

Scientific classification
- Kingdom: Animalia
- Phylum: Arthropoda
- Subphylum: Chelicerata
- Class: Arachnida
- Order: Araneae
- Infraorder: Araneomorphae
- Family: Salticidae
- Genus: Pachyballus
- Species: P. mombasensis

Binomial name
- Pachyballus mombasensis Wesołowska, Azarkina & Wiśniewski, 2020

= Pachyballus mombasensis =

Species of jumping spider

Pachyballus mombasensis is a species of jumping spider that is endemic to Kenya. A member of the genus Pachyballus, the species was first described in 2020. It was first found on Diani Beach, 30 km (19 mi) south of Mombasa. It is a very small brown spider, with a body that consists of a forward section called a cephalothorax that is between 1.1 and 1.3 mm (0.04 and 0.05 in) long and, behind that, an abdomen that is typically 2.1 mm (0.08 in) long. The spider is dark brown, apart from its darker eye field and yellow legs, although the front pair of male's legs are also brown. Otherwise, the male and female look very similar to the related ' Pachyballus castaneus and Pachyballus flavipes. It is necessary to look at the spiders' copulatory organs to distinguish them from others in the genus, particularly the shorter length of the female's insemination ducts and the size of the male's palpal bulb.

== Taxonomy and etymology ==
Pachyballus mombasensis is a species of jumping spider that was first described by the arachnologists Wanda Wesołowska, Galina Azarkina and Konrad Wiśniewski in 2020. It is one of over 500 different species identified by Wesołowska in her career. It has a name of the species relates to the place where the spider was first found. They allocated the spider to the genus Pachyballus, first circumscribed in 1900 by Eugène Simon.

When he first established the genus, Simon assigned Pachyballus to the Balleae group alongside the related genus Peplometus. In 2004, Suresh Benjamin tentatively included the genus, along with Ballus, in the subfamily Ballinae, and, in 2015, Wayne Maddison listed the genus within the tribe Ballini, derived from Simon's original name but attributed to an earlier author, Nathan Banks, from 1892. Phylogenetic analysis undertaken by Maddison and Marshall Hedin showed that the genus is closely related to Mantisatta, despite the large physiological differences between them. Wesołowska and Antonius van Harten noted the similarity of the genus with Planiemen. In 2016, Jerzy Prószyński added the genus to a group of genera termed Ballines, which contains many of the same genera, including Ballus, Peplometus and Planiemen. It is likely that the ballines diverged from the wider clade Marpissoida between 20 and 25 million years ago, although Daniela Andriamalala estimated the family to be 3.99 million years old.

== Description ==
Pachyballus mombasensis is a wide-bodied spider that, like other members of the genus, resembles a beetle the family Chrysomelidae. This may be a form of camouflage, enabling it to hide amongst trees. It is also very similar externally to the related related Pachyballus castaneus and Pachyballus flavipes. It is small and very flat with a strongly pitted exterior that shows signs of sclerotization. The spider's body is divided into two main parts: a round cephalothorax and a heart-shaped abdomen. The male has a cephalothorax that is typically 1.1 mm (0.04 in) long, and 1.1 mm (0.04 in) wide. Its carapace, the hard upper part of the cephalothorax, is dark brown. The eye field is darker, nearly black, with a few colourless bristles near the front row of eyes. Its chelicerae have three teeth to the back, while the remainder of the mouthparts brown, except for the existence of small white edging on the labium and maxillae.

The spider's abdomen is flat and is typically 2.1 mm (0.08 in) in length and width. Its topside is dark brown while its underside is dominated by a scutum, which is similar to other species in the genus. The first pair of legs are brown with two spines and dense furry hairs. The remainder of the legs are mainly yellow with brown parts. It has distinctive copulatory organs. The male has a rounded cymbium that has a bulge at the top while the palpal bulb has a pronounced bulge to the bottom. A very thin wiry embolus sprouts from the top the bulb in a coil and then projects upwards. Its palpal tibia is small and has an erect protrusion, or tibial apophysis, that has a slight bulge on it. This is very similar to Pachyballus flavipes, differing only in that the apophysis on this species hugs close to its cymbium. Its palpal bulb is wider than Pachyballus castaneus and its embolus has a looser coil.

The female is larger than the male, with a carapace that is typically 1.5 mm (0.06 in) long. In general it is similar to the male, although its front legs are the same as the others and it has a large scutum on its back. Both its top and bottom are mainly dark brown. Like the male, the female's copulatory organs are distinctive. Its epigyne, the external part of the spider's copulatory organs, has a semi-circular depression to the back and two copulatory openings near the front. These lead, via relatively short insemination ducts that loop around once, to relatively large spermathecae, or receptacles. The spermathecae show evidence of sclerotization. The shorter length of the insemination ducts distinguish the species from Pachyballus flavipes and Pachyballus miniscutulus.

== Distribution ==
Pachyballus spiders generally live in Africa and have been found in Yemen.Pachyballus mombasensis is endemic to Kenya. The male holotype was discovered in 1970 on Diani Beach, 30 km (19 mi) south of Mombasa. Other examples have been found locally.
