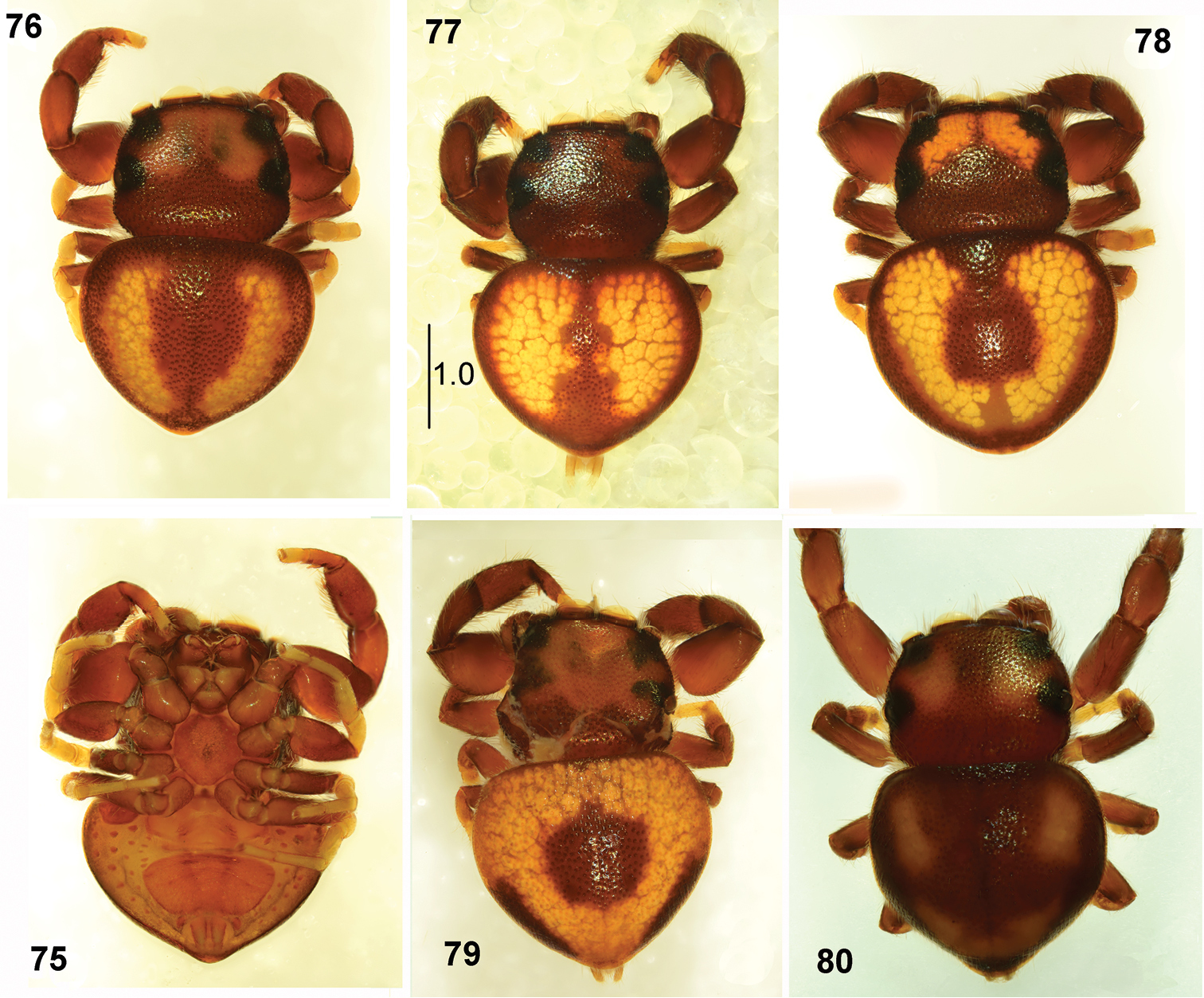
- Views from above and below of male specimens from Tanzania

Scientific classification
- Kingdom: Animalia
- Phylum: Arthropoda
- Subphylum: Chelicerata
- Class: Arachnida
- Order: Araneae
- Infraorder: Araneomorphae
- Family: Salticidae
- Genus: Pachyballus
- Species: P. ornatus

Binomial name
- Pachyballus ornatus Wesołowska, Azarkina & Wiśniewski, 2020
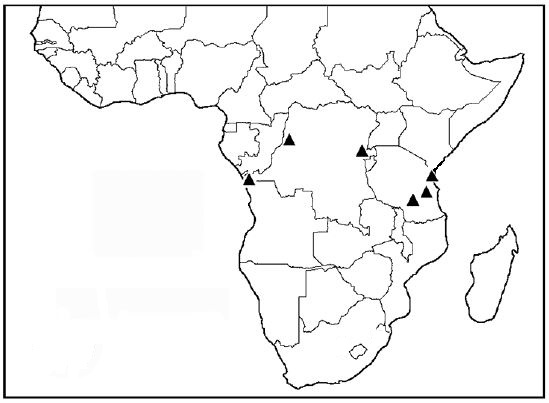
- The triangles indicate the distribution of Pachyballus ornatus in Africa

= Pachyballus ornatus =

Species of jumping spider

Pachyballus ornatus is a species of jumping spider in the genus Pachyballus that lives in the forested mountains of Democratic Republic of the Congo and Tanzania. A small spider, it has a cephalothorax that is from 1.2 to 1.7 mm long and an abdomen that is between 1.7 and 2.3 mm long. The spider is generally brown with a distinctive abdominal pattern of brown patches on a yellow background. This pattern is recalled in the specific name, which means 'decorated'. Younger females are darker and lack the pattern, which appears as they mature. In an immature state, they can be confused with the related Pachyballus flavipes. The spider has yellow spinnerets and brown pedipalps. Its front legs are stouter and darker than the rest. Its copulatory organs are typical for the genus. The male has a thin coiled embolus that projects from the palpal bulb. The female has a semi-circular depression towards the front of its epigyne that is divided by a wide ridge. It was first described in 2020.

== Taxonomy and etymology ==
Pachyballus ornatus is a species of jumping spider, a member of the family Salticidae, that was first described by the arachnologists Wanda Wesołowska, Galina Azarkina and Konrad Wiśniewski in 2020. It is one of over 500 different species identified by Wesołowska in her career. The specific name comes from the Latin word ornatus, which can be translated as 'decorated' and relates to the species' distinctive color pattern. The authors allocated the spider to the genus Pachyballus, first circumscribed in 1900 by Eugène Simon.

When he first established the genus, Simon assigned Pachyballus to the Balleae group alongside the related genus Peplometus. In their 2003 phylogenetic analysis, Wayne Maddison and Marshall Hedin noted that the genus is closely related to Mantisatta, despite the large physiological differences between them, and the similarity of those spiders with a group of genera they termed Marpissoida. In 2004, Suresh Benjamin tentatively included in the genus, along with Ballus, in his subfamily Ballinae. In 2007, Wesołowska and Anthony van Harten noted the similarity of the genus with Planiemen. In 2015, Maddison listed the genus within the tribe Ballini, derived from Simon's original name, but attributed to an earlier author, Nathan Banks from 1892. He allocated the tribe to the clade Marpissoida in the clade Salticoida. It is likely that the ballines diverged from the wider Marpissoida clade between 20 and 25 million years ago, although Daniela Andriamalala estimated the family to be 3.99 million years old. In 2016, Jerzy Prószyński added the genus to a group of genera termed Ballines, which contains many of the same genera, including Ballus, Peplometus and Planiemen.

== Description ==
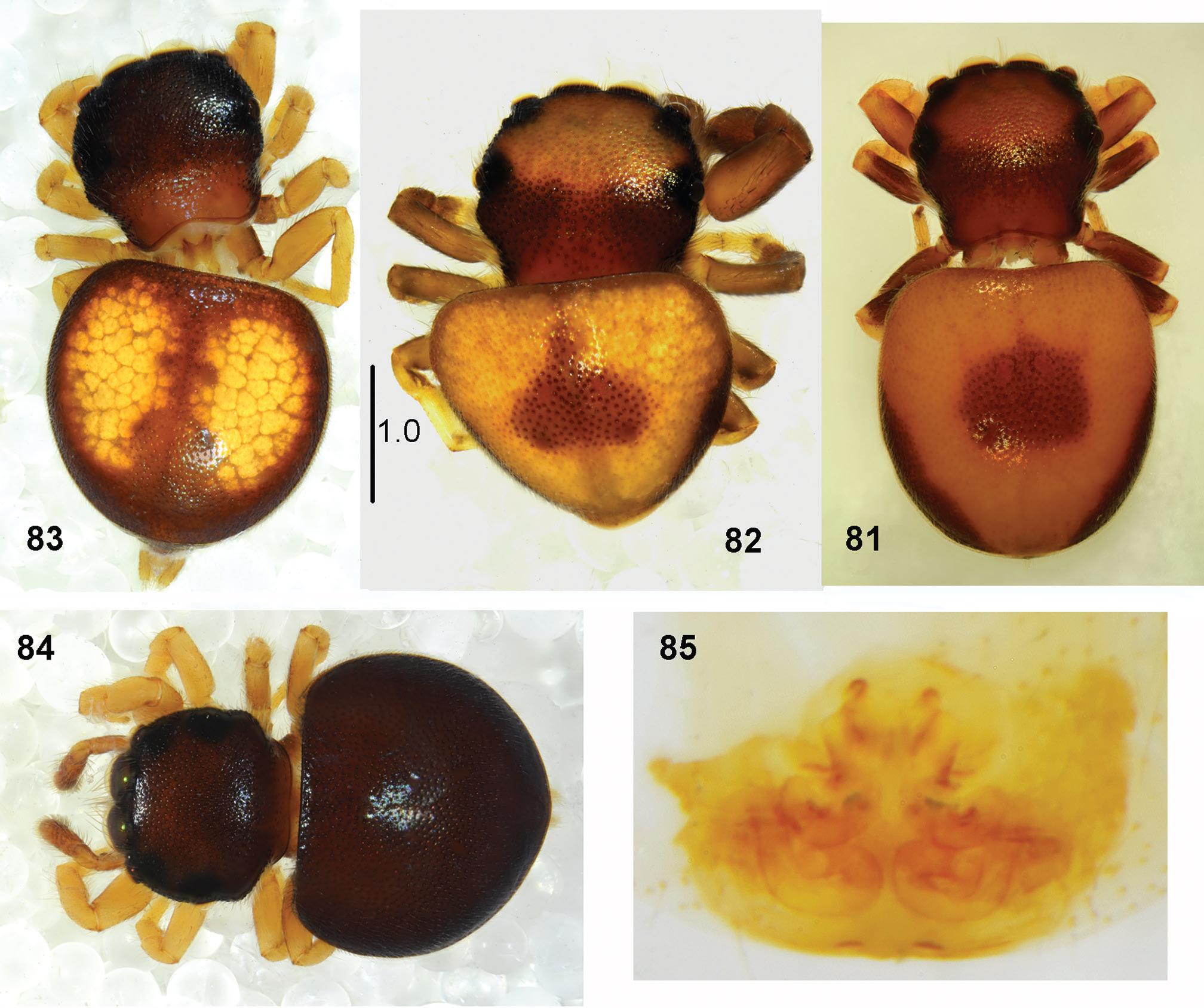
Female specimens of P. ornatus from Tanzania: 81–84 view from above; 85 epigyne

Pachyballus ornatus is a wide-bodied spider that resembles a beetle. It is small and very flat with a strongly pitted exterior that shows signs of sclerotization. The spider's body is divided into two main parts, a cephalothorax to the front and, behind that, an abdomen. The male has a cephalothorax that measures between 1.2 and 1.7 mm (0.05 and 0.07 in) in length and between 1.5 and 1.8 mm (0.06 and 0.07 in) in width. It abdomen is larger than the cephalothorax, measuring between 1.7 and 2.3 mm (0.09 in) in length and between 1.8 and 2.4 mm (0.09 in) in width. The female is similar in size to the male. It has a cephalothorax that measures between 1.3 and 1.5 mm (0.051 and 0.059 in) in length and between 1.4 mm (0.055 in) and 1.8 mm in width and abdomen between 1.9 and 2.1 mm (0.075 and 0.083 in) in length and 2 and 2.2 mm (0.079 and 0.087 in) in width.

The spider's carapace, the hard upper part of the cephalothorax, is wider than it is long with an eye field that takes up half of its area. The carapace is generally brown apart from black areas around the eyes, although some specimens have two large yellowish patches in their eye fields. The sternum, the underside of the cephalothorax, is rounded and brown. Its mouthparts are brownish, with white tips at the ends of the labium and maxillae. The spider's chelicerae have three short teeth at the front and a single tooth with serrated edges and four tips at the back. The female is similar in shape to the male.

Very flat, the spider's abdomen varies between triangular and heart-shaped and is generally wider than it is long with a front edge that is almost straight. Although it is mainly yellow, it has a brown marking in the middle and along its edges. In some examples, there is a brown line that extends from the central marking to the front and back of the abdomen while on others the marking and the line seem to be merged so that the effect is that of a large serrated streak running down the spider's abdomen. The underside is brown with a noticeable hard plate or scutum. The spider has yellow spinnerets. The first pair of legs are brown with two spines and dense furry hairs. The remainder of the legs are mainly yellow with brown parts.

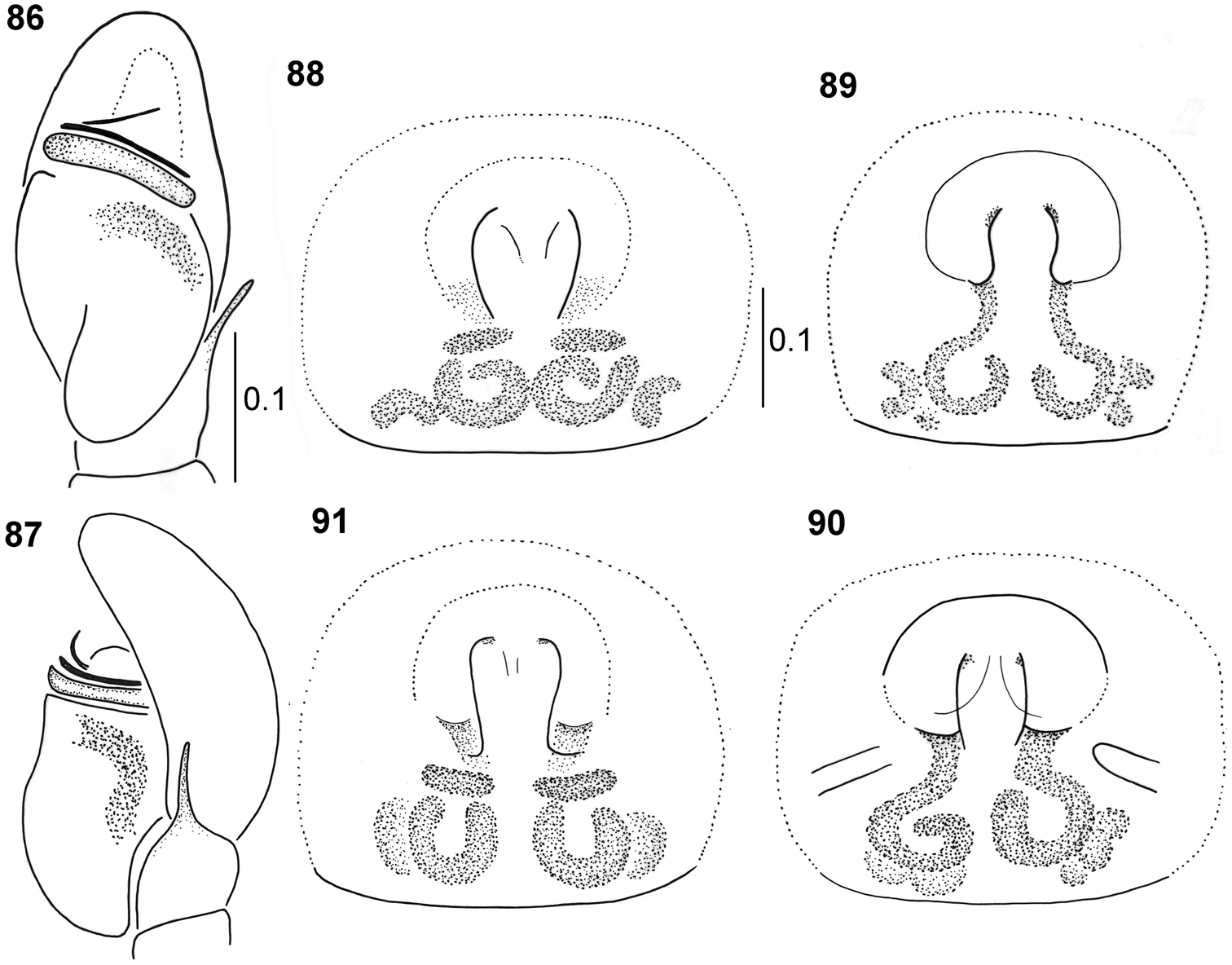
Drawings representing the copulatory organs of P. ornatus: 86–87 palpal organ, respectively viewed from below and laterally; 88–91 epigyne

Pachyballus ornatus has distinctive copulatory organs. The male has a relatively large rounded cymbium that curves around a smaller palpal bulb, the latter with a pronounced bulge at the bottom. The bulb has a thin projection called an embolus extending from its top that wraps itself in tight coils before projecting away from the bulb and curving in towards the cymbium. The small palpal tibia has a single small curved spike, or tibial apophysis, projecting upwards. The female spider's epigyne, or external and most visible part of the female copulatory organs, is oval with a semi-circular depression to the front that is split into two by a short wide ridge. The two copulatory openings lead to long ducts that wind their way to relatively small oval receptacles called spermathecae.

Some of the examples of the spider that have been found, particularly young females just after moulting, are black all over, similar to the related Pachyballus flavipes. The spiders can be distinguished from that species by their darker pedipalps. It appears that the spiders are darker when younger and get lighter as they age.

== Distribution and habitat ==
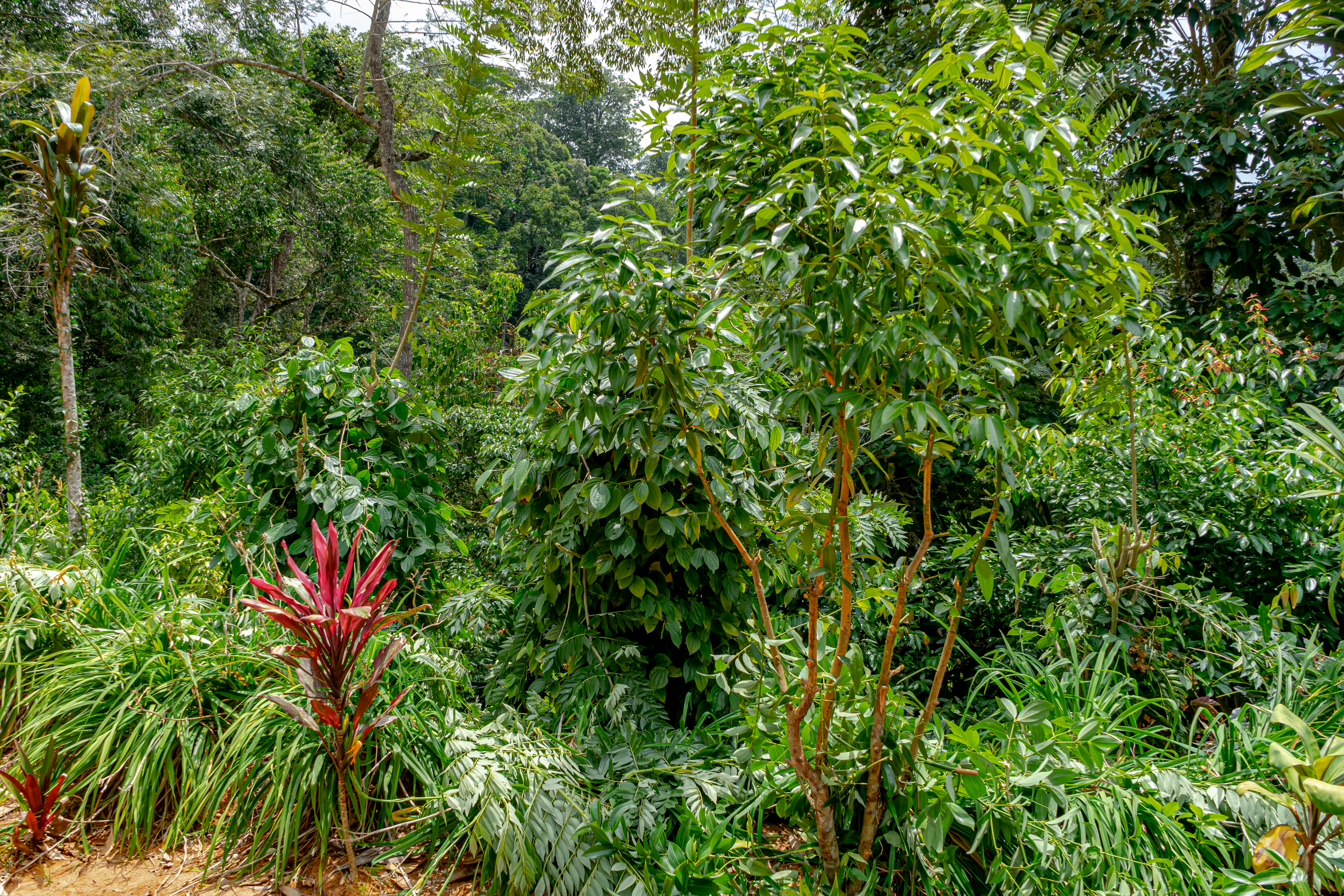
The Amani Nature Reserve, where the holotype was found

Pachyballus spiders generally live in Africa and have been found in Yemen. Pachyballus ornatus lives in Democratic Republic of the Congo and Tanzania. The holotype was found in Amani Nature Reserve in Tanzania at an altitude of 550 m (1,800 ft) above sea level in 1995. Other examples have been found in other areas, including the Udzungwa and Uluguru Mountains. The spider lives in forests, particularly montane rainforests. Its resemblance to beetles of the family Chrysomelidae may be a form of camouflage, enabling it to hide amongst the trees.
