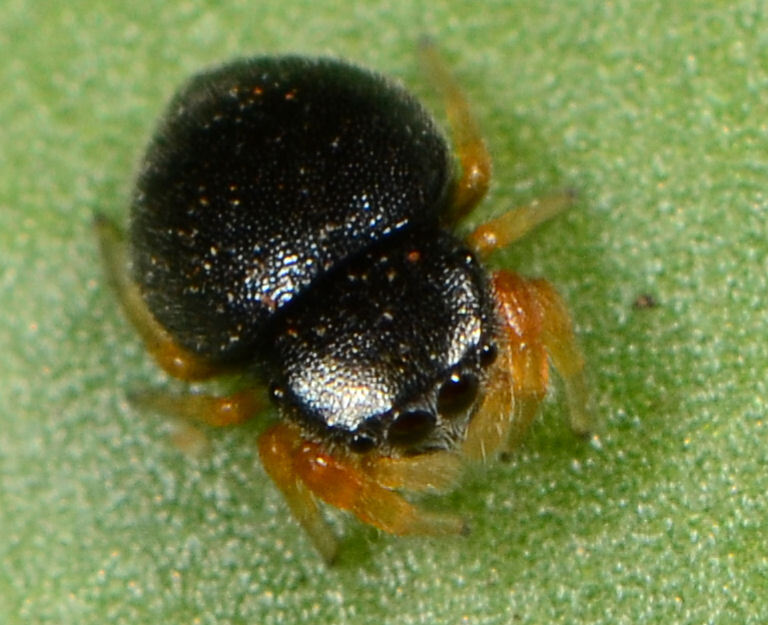
- male
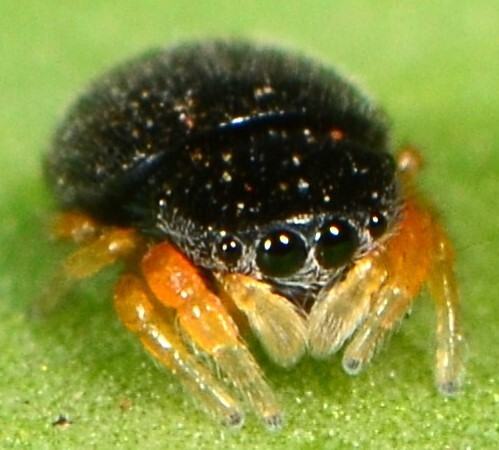
- male

Scientific classification
- Kingdom: Animalia
- Phylum: Arthropoda
- Subphylum: Chelicerata
- Class: Arachnida
- Order: Araneae
- Infraorder: Araneomorphae
- Family: Salticidae
- Genus: Pachyballus
- Species: P. miniscutulus

Binomial name
- Pachyballus miniscutulus Wesołowska, Azarkina & Wiśniewski, 2020

= Pachyballus miniscutulus =

Species of jumping spider

Pachyballus miniscutulus is a species of jumping spider that is native to Ivory Coast and South Africa. It lives in open grassland and in vegetation near to streams. A very small spider, it has a cephalothorax that is ranges from 1 to 1.3 mm long and an abdomen that is between 1.7 and 1.9 mm long. The spider is generally dark brown on top. The bottom of its cephalothorax is yellowish-brown and its abdomen is grey-brown and has a distinctive scutum. This scutum is referenced in the species name, which is derived from the Latin words that mean "small shield". The spider has a dark brown clypeus and yellowish-brown spinnerets. Apart from the scutum, the spider can be identified by its copulatory organs. The male has a palpal bulb that has bulges that extend below its cymbium and the female has a heart-shaped epigyne that contains a spade-like or circular section and longer insemination ducts than Pachyballus mombasensis. A member of the genus Pachyballus, the species was first described in 2020 by Wanda Wesołowska, Galina Azarkina and Konrad Wiśniewski.

== Taxonomy and etymology ==
Pachyballus miniscutulus is a species of jumping spider, a member of the family Salticidae, that was first described by the arachnologists Wanda Wesołowska, Galina Azarkina and Konrad Wiśniewski in 2020. It is one of over 500 different species identified by Wesołowska in her career. It has a species name that is made of the two Latin words mini and scutulus, which can be translated "small" and "shield" respectively. They allocated the spider to the genus Pachyballus, first circumscribed in 1900 by Eugène Simon. The holotype was found in 2012 but had previously been simply recognised as a member of the genus without any further comment and it was only when Wesołowska, Azarkina and Wiśniewski undertook a thorough revision of the genus that it was full described.

When he first established the genus Pachyballus, Eugène Simon assigned it to the Balleae group alongside the related genus Peplometus. In 2004, Suresh Benjamin tentatively included in the genus, along with Ballus, in the subfamily Ballinae, and, in 2015, Wayne Maddison listed the genus within the tribe Ballini, derived from Simon's original name but attributed to an earlier author, Nathan Banks from 1892. Phylogenetic analysis undertaken by Maddison and Marshall Hedin showed that the genus is closely related to Mantisatta, despite the large physiological differences between them. In 2016, Jerzy Prószyński added the genus to a group of genera termed Ballines, which contains many of the same genera, including Ballus, Peplometus and Planiemen. It is likely that the ballines diverged from the wider clade Marpissoida between 20 and 25 million years ago, although Daniela Andriamalala estimated the family to be 3.99 million years old.

== Description ==
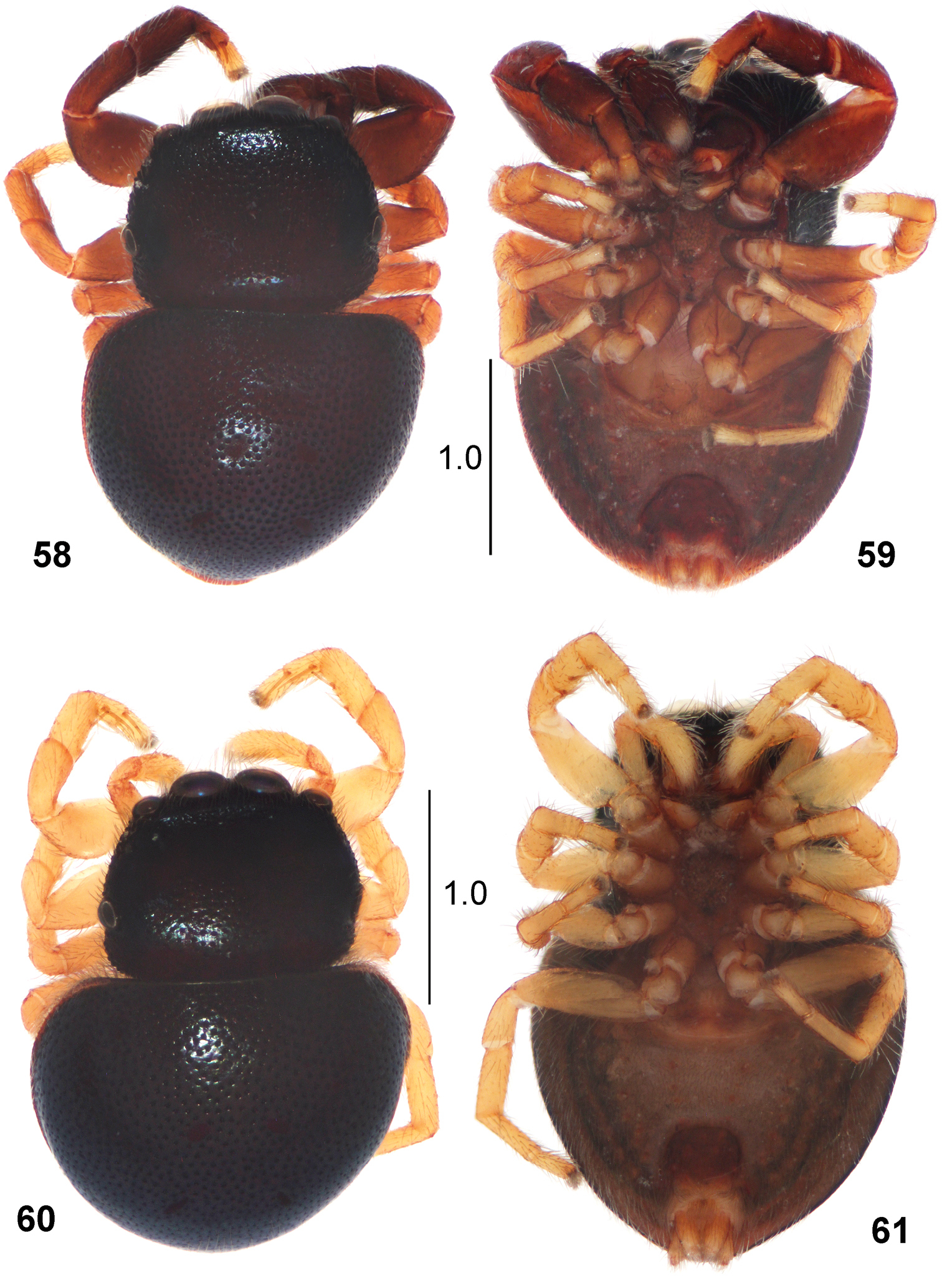

Pachyballus miniscutulus is a wide-bodied spider that resembles a beetle. It is very small and can be overlooked or misidentified as immature spiders. The spider's body is divided into two main parts: a round cephalothorax and a larger, wider, and heart-shaped abdomen. The male has a cephalothorax that typically measures 1.3 mm (0.051 in) in length and 1.25 mm (0.049 in) in width. The carapace, the hard upper part of the cephalothorax, is dark brown with black rings around the spider's eyes. The sternum, the underside of the cephalothorax, is yellowish-brown. The main parts of its mouthparts, including its labium and maxillae, are also yellowish-brown; however, the spider's chelicerae are dark brown. Its clypeus and cheeks are also dark brown, but they also have a covering of sparse white hairs.

The spider's abdomen is larger than the cephalothorax, measuring around 1.7 mm (0.07 in) in length and width. It is dark brown on top and brownish-grey underneath. There is also a small noticeable scutum on the underside that typically covers a fifth of the total length of the abdomen. This small scutum is the source of the spider's name. The spider has yellow book lung covers and yellowish-brown spinnerets. The spider's first pair of legs are brown with yellow sections while the remainder are a uniform lighter brown. All have brown leg hairs.

Pachyballus miniscutulus has distinctive copulatory organs. It has brown pedipalps with yellow tips. The cymbium is semi-cylindrical in shape and has a noticeable notch near the top on the inside. Beneath this, it is attached to the palpal bulb, which is very bulbous and extends below the cymbium. The bulb has a long embolus extending from its top that wraps around the bulb in a wide coil and projects from this out to the side. The palpal tibia has a single small curved spike, or tibial apophysis, projecting upwards.

The female has a smaller cephalothorax than the male, measuring between 1 and 1.1 mm (0.039 and 0.043 in) in length and between 1.1 and 1.2 mm (0.047 in) in width, while its abdomen is larger, between 1.8 and 1.9 mm (0.071 and 0.075 in) in length and 1.5 mm (0.059 in) and 1.8 mm in width. It is similar externally to the male, apart from its yellow legs and pedipalps. As with the male, it has distinctive copulatory organs. The female spider's epigyne, or externally visible copulatory organ, is heart-shaped and has a semi-circular depression that contains a spade-like or circular section. The two copulatory openings lead to insemination ducts that wind their way to relatively small receptacles, or spermathecae.

The species is distinguished from others in the genus by the small scutum at the base of its abdomen. This is also proportionately wider than related spiders, two or three times more, and equal to the distance between the spinnerets. It can also be identified by its copulatory organs. Although externally the female is similar to Pachyballus mombasensis, particularly the shape of its epigyne, its insemination ducts are longer.

== Distribution and habitat ==
Pachyballus spiders generally live in Africa and have been found in Yemen. Pachyballus miniscutulus lives in Ivory Coast and South Africa. It is one of four species of Pachyballus spiders identified at the same time living in South Africa. The holotype was found in the Free State National Botanical Garden in 2012. Other examples have been found in the area and also in Ithala Game Reserve in KwaZulu-Natal. The first example to be seen in Ivory Coast was found in 1976 but was not identified until 2022. The spider lives in vegetation near to streams and in open grassland. Specimens have been found in the plant litter under Searsia lancea and at the base of grassy tussocks.
