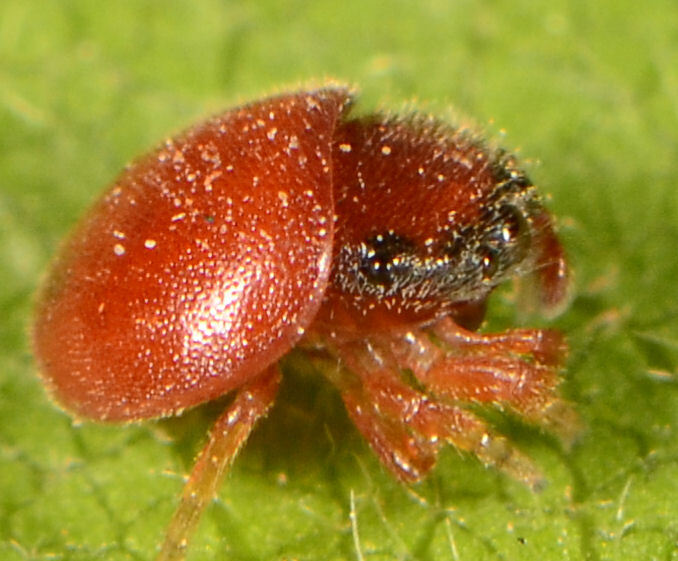
- female
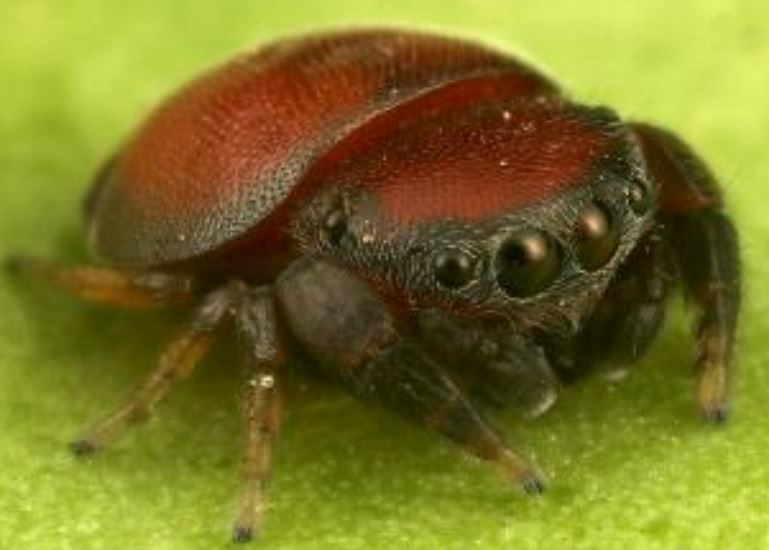
- male

Scientific classification
- Kingdom: Animalia
- Phylum: Arthropoda
- Subphylum: Chelicerata
- Class: Arachnida
- Order: Araneae
- Infraorder: Araneomorphae
- Family: Salticidae
- Genus: Pachyballus
- Species: P. castaneus

Binomial name
- Pachyballus castaneus Simon, 1900

= Pachyballus castaneus =

Species of jumping spider

Pachyballus castaneus is a species of jumping spider that is native to South Africa and Zimbabwe. Despite being a jumping spider, it prefers to walk rather than to jump and will run if disturbed. It lives in a wide range of habitat, from open grassland to forests. A member of the genus Pachyballus, the spider looks like a beetle, with a body that consists of a round forward section, or cephalothorax, that is between 0.9 and 1.4 mm (0.035 and 0.055 in) in length and a heart-shaped rear section, or abdomen, that is between 1.7 and 2.2 mm (0.067 and 0.087 in) in length. Externally, the spider is hard to distinguish from other species in the genus. It is generally dark brown on top while the abdomen is brownish-grey underneath and has two hard plates known as scuta, the rear one shaped like a trapezium. Its copulatory organs are distinctive. The male has a thinner pedipalp and a more compact coiled embolus than related spiders. The female has a different internal structure to other members of the genus with shorter insemination ducts that lack any loops.

A diurnal species, P. castaneus is usually found near broadleaved plants in savannah and grassland regions. It also inhabits wetland amongst trees, the canopy of coastal forests, sand forests of Ndumo Game Reserve, and the more open areas of Kruger National Park. It prefers running rather than jumping on most occasions, even when disturbed. As a natural predator, P. castaneus is a visually-oriented hunter that feeds on various insects, including Chironomidae, Drosophilidae, Psocoptera, and Psyllidae.

== Taxonomy and etymology ==
Pachyballus castaneus is a species of jumping spider, a member of the family Salticidae, that was first described by the arachnologist Eugène Simon in 1900. He mentioned "Natal" as the type locality and, initially, he only described the female. It was not until 2020 that the male was described by Wanda Wesołowska, Galina Azarkina and Konrad Wiśniewski. In the original description, Simon did not discuss the etymology of the scientific name castaneus. This word derives from a latinization of the Greek word κάστανος (kastanos), which means 'chestnut-tree'; castaneus means 'of the color of chestnuts', 'brown' or 'bay'. Nevertheless, Simon mentioned the reddish-brown (rubro-castaneis, in Latin) coloration of the species' body. When he first circumscribed the genus Pachyballus, Simon assigned it to the Balleae group alongside the related genus Peplometus.

In 2004, Suresh Benjamin tentatively included in the genus, along with Ballus, in the subfamily Ballinae, and, in 2015, Wayne Maddison listed the genus within the tribe Ballini, derived from Simon's original name but attributed to an earlier author, Nathan Banks from 1892. Phylogenetic analysis undertaken by Maddison and Marshall Hedin showed that the genus is closely related to Mantisatta, despite the large physiological differences between them. In 2016, Jerzy Prószyński added the genus to a group of genera termed Ballines, which contains many of the same genera, including Ballus, Peplometus and Planiemen. It is likely that the ballines diverged from the wider clade Marpissoida between 20 and 25 million years ago, although Daniela Andriamalala estimated the family to be 3.99 million years old.

== Description ==
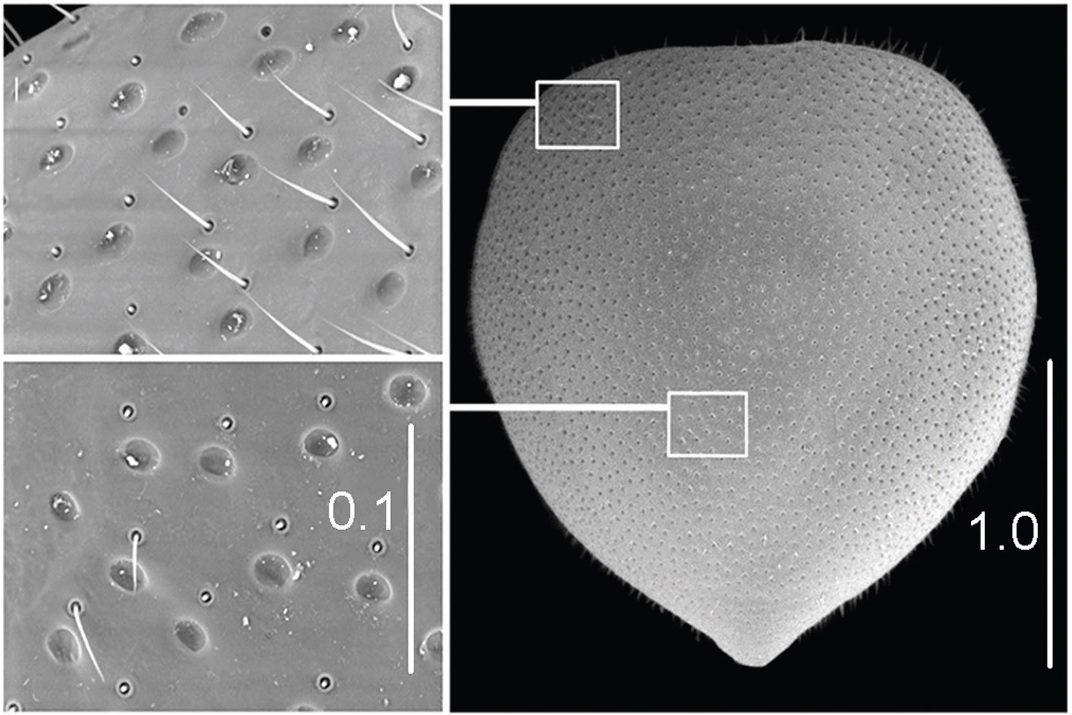
The heart-shaped abdomen of Pachyballus castaneus with its pitted surface viewed under SEM (scales in mm)

Pachyballus castaneus is a wide-bodied spider that resembles a beetle. It particularly resembles members of the Coccinellidae family, noticeably in the short white hairs that can be seen on its body and legs. The spider's body is divided into two main parts: a round cephalothorax and a larger, wider, and heart-shaped abdomen. It is generally flattened and covered with a pitted protective layer. The male has a cephalothorax that measures between 0.9 and 1.3 mm (0.035 and 0.051 in) in length and between 1.3 and 1.9 mm (0.075 in) in width. The carapace, the hard upper part of the cephalothorax, is dark brown with black areas and a small number of long bristles around the spider's eyes. Its eye field takes up about half of its carapace. Its sternum, the underside of the cephalothorax, is brown. The main parts of its mouthparts, including its labium and maxillae, are also brown. The spider's chelicerae has three teeth at both the front and back. The lower part of its face, or clypeus, is very low.

The male spider's abdomen is larger than the cephalothorax, measuring between 1.7 and 2.2 mm (0.07 and 0.09 in) in length and between 1.8 and 2.6 mm (0.07 and 0.10 in) in width. It is dark brown on top and brownish-grey underneath. There is also a large noticeable hard plate, or scutum, on the top and two small scuta on the bottom, the front one narrow and the back one shaped like a trapezium. The spider has brown spinnerets. The spider's first pair of legs are brown with yellow sections while the remainder are a uniform yellow. The front legs are thicker, covered in short hairs and have four short stout spines.

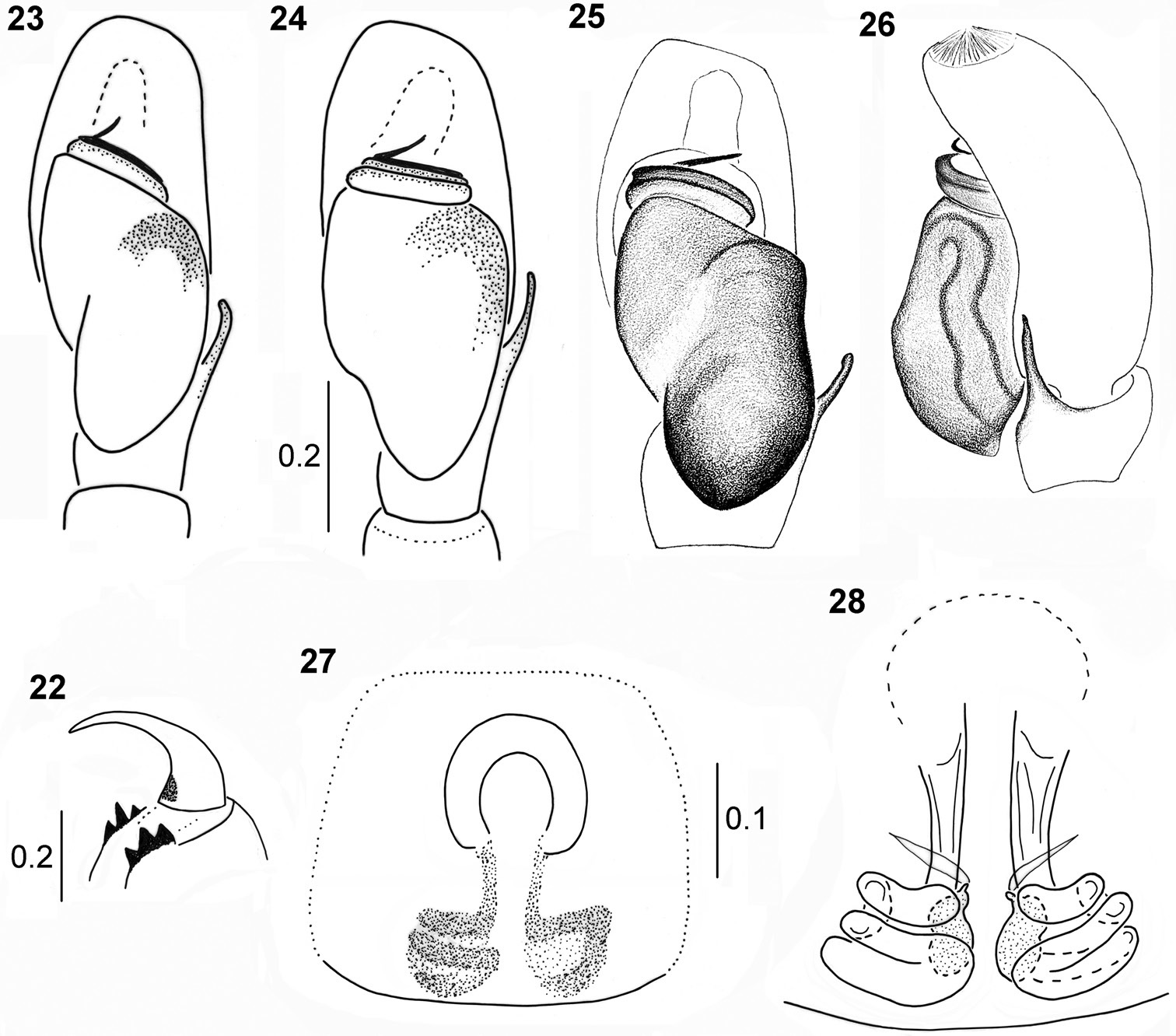
Copulatory organs of Pachyballus castaneus: 22 cheliceral dentition; 23–25 palpal organ, ventral view; 26 palpal organ, lateral view; 27 epigyne; 28 internal structure of epigyne (scales in mm)

Pachyballus castaneus has distinctive copulatory organs. It has brown pedipalps, sensory organs that are located near the spider's face, that are narrower than similar spiders. Its cymbium is relatively large, larger than the palpal bulb, which has a large bulge that projects below the cymbium. The bulb that lies alongside the cymbium has a long embolus extending from its top, spiralling around tightly in a series of coils that are half the diameter of the tegulum and projects upwards. The palpal tibia also has a single small curved spike, or tibial apophysis, projecting upwards.

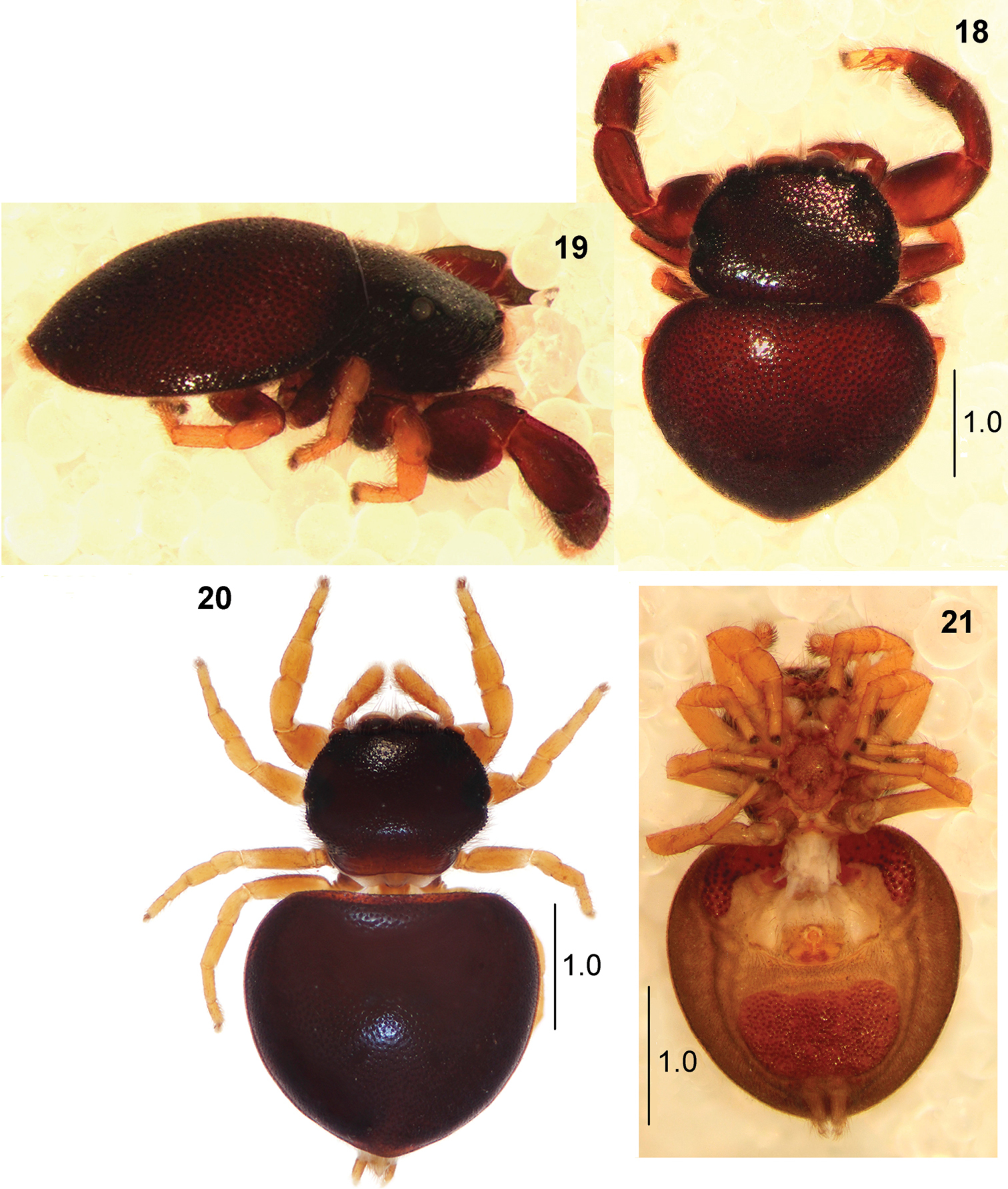
Male (top) and female (bottom) Pachyballus castaneus from South Africa

The female has a smaller cephalothorax than the male, measuring between 0.9 and 1.4 mm (0.035 and 0.055 in) in length and between 1.2 mm (0.047 in) and 1.4 in width, while its abdomen is larger, between 1.7 and 2 mm (0.067 and 0.079 in) in length and 1.8 and 2.1 mm (0.071 and 0.083 in) in width. It has the same two scuta on the base of the abdomen as the male. It differs in the shape of the abdomen, which has a flatter edge where it meets the carapace. Its legs are all dark yellow, as are its pedipalps. The female spider's epigyne, or externally visible copulatory organ, is typical for the genus, with a depressed shaped like a horse shoe. The two copulatory openings lead to short insemination ducts that lead directly to relatively small receptacles, or spermathecae. The spermathecae show evidence of sclerotization.

The species is hard to differentiate from its relatives, with the male looking externally almost identical to Pachyballus flavipes and Pachyballus mombasensis. It can be distinguished from others in the genus by its narrow palpal bulb and the way that its embolus spirals more tightly, with the base of the loops about half the diameter of the other species. The internal structure of the female copulatory organs is also unusual as the insemination ducts lack any loops.

== Behaviour ==
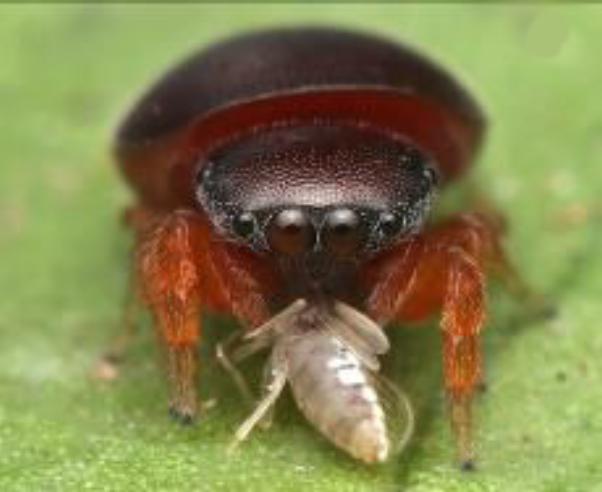
Pachyballus castaneus feeding on Psyllidae

Pachyballus castaneus moves around in the daytime, often seen wandering around on broadleaved plants. It will generally walk rather than jump, only jumping to cross a gap, and show a preference for fast running when disturbed. It preys on a wide range of insects, including both juvenile and adult specimens of midges (Chironomidae), fruit flies (Drosophilidae), booklice (Psocoptera), and plant lice (Psyllidae). Like other jumping spiders, it uses its good eyesight to spot its prey rather than catching it in webs.

== Distribution and habitat ==
Pachyballus spiders generally live in Africa and have been found in Yemen. Pachyballus castaneus lives in South Africa and Zimbabwe, and may also live in Mozambique. The holotype was found in Kwa-Zulu Natal but has been lost. The species was later recorded in eMakhosini Ophathe Heritage Park living in savanna grassland. It inhabits wetland amongst trees such as Breonadia salicina and the canopy of coastal forests of Trichilia dregeana. It has also been seen in the sand forests of Ndumo Game Reserve and the more open areas of Kruger National Park. It has also been seen in areas of overgrazing. The first specimen to be seen in Mozambique was identified in 2007, although this subadult female may be a related species. The first sighting in Zimbabwe took place near Harare in 2012.
