= Peplometus oyo =

Scientific classification
- Kingdom: Animalia
- Phylum: Arthropoda
- Subphylum: Chelicerata
- Class: Arachnida
- Order: Araneae
- Infraorder: Araneomorphae
- Family: Salticidae
- Genus: Peplometus
- Species: P. oyo

Binomial name
- Peplometus oyo (Wesołowska & Russell-Smith, 2011)

Species of jumping spider

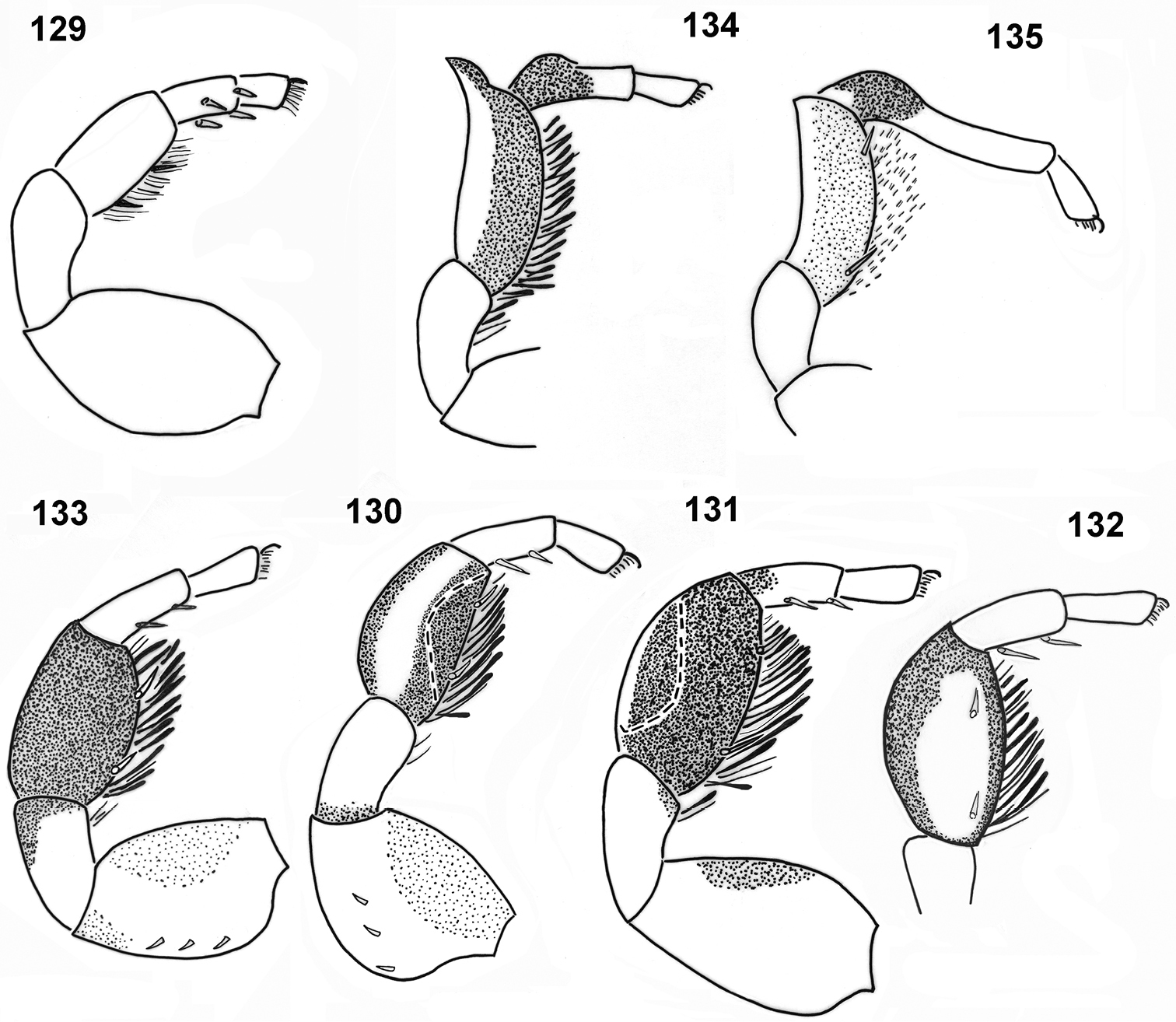
The leg (#134) of Peplometus oyo

Peplometus oyo is a species of jumping spider that looks like a beetle. Originally described in 2011 with the name Pachyballus oyo, it was given its current name in 2022. It was first found in Oyo State, after which it is named, and lives in Southern Nigeria. A member of the genus Peplometus, it is a small spider with a forward section, known as a cephalothorax, that is between 1.2 and 1.4 mm long and, behind that, an abdomen that is between 1.7 and 2.1 mm long. The spider is generally brown. Younger spiders have an abdomen with two hard plates called scuta on the top. These fuse as they grow up into a single plate. On the bottom, females have another plate that is heart-shaped. Males also have two other smaller plates, one round and the other wedge-shaped. The males can be distinguished from others in the genus by its legs, particularly the presence of a large bulge on its front legs. The females can be identified by the shape of their abdomen, which is flatter than most of the species in the genus.

== Taxonomy and etymology ==
Peplometus oyo is a species of jumping spider, a member of the family Salticidae, that was first described in 2011 by the arachnologists Wanda Wesołowska and Anthony Russell-Smith. It is one of over 500 different species identified by Wesołowska in her career. Its specific name comes from Oyo State where it was first found. The authors allocated the spider to the genus Pachyballus with the name Pachyballus oyo. In 2022, Wesołowska, Galina Azarkina and Konrad Wiśniewski created a new combination Peplometus oyo and moved the species to the genus Peplometus.

The genera were first circumscribed in 1900 by Eugène Simon. They are closely related and, when he first established the genera, he assigned both Pachyballus and Peplometus to the Balleae group. In their 2003 phylogenetic analysis, Wayne Maddison and Marshall Hedin noted that Pachyballus is closely related to Mantisatta, despite the large physiological differences between them, and the similarity of those spiders with a group of genera they termed Marpissoida but made no comment on Peplometus. In 2015, Maddison listed both genera within the tribe Ballini, derived from Simon's original name for the related genus Ballus, but attributed to an earlier author, Nathan Banks from 1892. He allocated the tribe to the clade Marpissoida in the clade Salticoida. It is likely that the ballines diverged from the wider Marpissoida clade between 20 and 25 million years ago, although Daniela Andriamalala estimated the family to be 3.99 million years old. In 2016, Jerzy Prószyński added the genus to a group of genera termed Ballines, which contains many of the same genera, including Ballus and Pachyballus.

== Description ==
Peplometus spiders are a wide-bodied and resemble beetles. Peplometus oyo is hard to distinguish from others in the genus. It has a generally flattened appearance and has a pitted exterior that shows signs of sclerotization. The spider's body is divided into two main parts, a cephalothorax that integrates its head to the front and, behind that, an elongated abdomen. The male has a cephalothorax that measures between 1.3 and 1.4 mm (0.051 and 0.055 in) in length and between 1.1 and 1.3 mm (0.043 and 0.051 in) in width. Its carapace, the hard upper part of the cephalothorax, is a trapezoid, dark brown, nearly black, and covered in very delicate colourless hairs. There are also long hairs and a few bristles near the eyes. Its sternum, the underside of the cephalothorax, is light brown. As well as a short fang, the spider has two teeth to the front of its chelicerae and four teeth at the back. Of its remaining mouthparts, its labium are light brown and maxillae are yellow.

The male's abdomen is elongated and longer than its cephalothorax, between 1.7 and 2 mm (0.067 and 0.079 in) in length and 1.3 and 1.4 mm (0.051 and 0.055 in) in width. It overlaps at the front, extending over part of its carapace. When they are young, the spiders have two large hard plates, or scuta, on their top side that show strong evidence of sclerotization. As they mature, the plates join together, with adults having a single large plate. The under side of the spider's abdomen has three scuta, the front one round, the middle one wedge-shaped and the back one, the largest, heart-shaped. There are many small hard round dots on its sides. The spider has two sets of spinnerets that it uses to spin webs, the forward ones being brown and the rear yellowish. Its legs are generally yellow and marked with thin dark lines. The front legs are larger and thicker than the others and have long black scale-like hairs. There is a distinctive bulge on the tibia of the front leg. It is this that distinguishes the species from others in the genus.

It has yellow pedipalps, sensory organs near its mouth. These end in its copulatory organs, which include a rounded cymbium next to a smaller more triangular palpal bulb. The bulb consists of a tegulum that has a pointed bulge at the bottom and a thin projection called an embolus extending from its top that wraps itself in tight coils before projecting away from the bulb. The palpal tibia has a single spike, or tibial apophysis, projecting upwards.

The female is similar in size to the male. It has a cephalothorax that measures between 1.2 and 1.3 mm (0.05 and 0.05 in) in length and between 1.1 and 1.2 mm (0.04 and 0.05 in) in width. The spider's chelicerae are similar to the male. Its abdomen is longer and slightly wider than the cephalothorax, measuring between 1.8 and 2.1 mm (0.07 and 0.08 in) in length and between 1.7 and 1.8 mm (0.07 and 0.07 in) in width. It is flatter than the male's abdomen and has only one large heart-shaped scuta on its bottom side. The shape of this abdomen is what most easily distinguishes the spider from others in the genus. Unlike the male, it has front legs that are similar in size to the rest. Whitish-yellow, they have brown stripes and four large spines. The female spider's epigyne, or external and most visible part of its copulatory organs, is relatively large and shaped somewhat like a trapezium. It has a round depression in the middle and two copulatory openings lead via looping insemination ducts to small kidney-shaped receptacles called spermathecae.

== Distribution and habitat ==
Peplometus oyo lives in Southern Nigeria. The holotype for the species was found at the International Institute of Tropical Agriculture in Ibadan, which is in Oyo State. It has also been seen in the nearby Gambari forest reserve. The spider lives in secondary forest. Its resemblance to beetles may be a form of camouflage, enabling it to hide amongst the trees.
