= Notiomaso =

Scientific classification
- Kingdom: Animalia
- Phylum: Arthropoda
- Subphylum: Chelicerata
- Class: Arachnida
- Order: Araneae
- Infraorder: Araneomorphae
- Family: Linyphiidae
- Genus: Notiomaso; Banks, 1914

Type species
- N. australis Banks, 1914

Species
- 9, see text

Synonyms
- Beauchenia Usher, 1983; Micromaso Tambs-Lyche, 1954; Microsphalma Millidge, 1991; Perimaso Tambs-Lyche, 1954

Genus of spiders

Notiomaso is a genus of South American dwarf spiders that was first described by Nathan Banks in 1914.

== Species ==
As of May 2019 it contains nine species, found in Argentina and Chile:

- Notiomaso australis Banks, 1914 (type) – Falkland Is., South Georgia
- Notiomaso barbatus (Tullgren, 1901) – Chile, Argentina, Falkland Is.
- Notiomaso christina Lavery & Snazell, 2013 – Falkland Is.
- Notiomaso exonychus Miller, 2007 – Chile
- Notiomaso flavus (Tambs-Lyche, 1954) – Falkland Is., South Georgia
- Notiomaso grytvikensis (Tambs-Lyche, 1954) – South Georgia
- Notiomaso shackletoni Lavery & Snazell, 2013 – Falkland Is.
- Notiomaso spei Lavery & Snazell, 2018 – South Georgia
- Notiomaso striatus (Usher, 1983) – Falkland Is.
