= Gnathonargus =

Scientific classification
- Kingdom: Animalia
- Phylum: Arthropoda
- Subphylum: Chelicerata
- Class: Arachnida
- Order: Araneae
- Infraorder: Araneomorphae
- Family: Linyphiidae
- Genus: Gnathonargus; Bishop & Crosby, 1935
- Species: G. unicorn

Binomial name
- Gnathonargus unicorn (Banks, 1892)

Genus of spiders

Gnathonargus is a monotypic genus of North American dwarf spiders containing the single species, Gnathonargus unicorn. It was first described by S. C. Bishop & C. R. Crosby in 1935, and has only been found in the United States.

The species name alludes to the diagnostic projection issuing from the clypeus in males, an elongate, slender rod with a rounded end that points diagonally upward.
