= Pseudostenophylax edwardsi =

Conservation status
- Apparently Secure (NatureServe)

Scientific classification
- Kingdom: Animalia
- Phylum: Arthropoda
- Clade: Pancrustacea
- Class: Insecta
- Order: Trichoptera
- Family: Limnephilidae
- Genus: Pseudostenophylax
- Species: P. edwardsi

Binomial name
- Pseudostenophylax edwardsi (Banks, 1920)

Synonyms
- Drusinus edwardsi (Banks, 1920); Anisogamus atripennis Banks, 1924; Onocosmoecus atripennis (Banks, 1924)

Species of caddisfly

Pseudostenophylax edwardsi, commonly known as Edwards's northern caddisfly or limnéphile d'Edwards, is a species of caddisfly in the family Limnephilidae. It is native to western North America.

== Distribution and habitat ==
Pseudostenophylax edwardsi occurs in the province of British Columbia in Canada and in the states of California, Idaho, and Oregon in the United States. It lives in montane areas, with the larvae and pupae being found in both temporary and permanent seepage areas.
