= Cheniseo =

Scientific classification
- Kingdom: Animalia
- Phylum: Arthropoda
- Subphylum: Chelicerata
- Class: Arachnida
- Order: Araneae
- Infraorder: Araneomorphae
- Family: Linyphiidae
- Genus: Cheniseo; Bishop & Crosby, 1935

Type species
- C. fabulosa Bishop & Crosby, 1935

Species
- 4, see text

Genus of spiders

Cheniseo is a genus of North American dwarf spiders that was first described by S. C. Bishop & C. R. Crosby in 1935.

== Species ==
As of May 2019 it contains four species:

- Cheniseo fabulosa Bishop & Crosby, 1935 (type) – USA
- Cheniseo faceta Bishop & Crosby, 1935 – USA
- Cheniseo recurvata (Banks, 1900) – USA (Alaska)
- Cheniseo sphagnicultor Bishop & Crosby, 1935 – USA, Canada
