= Pelecopsidis =

Scientific classification
- Kingdom: Animalia
- Phylum: Arthropoda
- Subphylum: Chelicerata
- Class: Arachnida
- Order: Araneae
- Infraorder: Araneomorphae
- Family: Linyphiidae
- Genus: Pelecopsidis; Bishop & Crosby, 1935
- Species: P. frontalis

Binomial name
- Pelecopsidis frontalis (Banks, 1904)

Genus of spiders

Pelecopsidis is a monotypic genus of North American dwarf spiders containing the single species, Pelecopsidis frontalis. It was first described by S. C. Bishop & C. R. Crosby in 1935, and has only been found in the United States.
