= Ceratinopsidis =

Scientific classification
- Kingdom: Animalia
- Phylum: Arthropoda
- Subphylum: Chelicerata
- Class: Arachnida
- Order: Araneae
- Infraorder: Araneomorphae
- Family: Linyphiidae
- Genus: Ceratinopsidis; Bishop & Crosby, 1930
- Species: C. formosa

Binomial name
- Ceratinopsidis formosa (Banks, 1892)

Genus of spiders

Ceratinopsidis is a monotypic genus of North American dwarf spiders containing the single species, Ceratinopsidis formosa. It was first described by S. C. Bishop & C. R. Crosby in 1930, and has only been found in United States.
