= Oaphantes =

Scientific classification
- Kingdom: Animalia
- Phylum: Arthropoda
- Subphylum: Chelicerata
- Class: Arachnida
- Order: Araneae
- Infraorder: Araneomorphae
- Family: Linyphiidae
- Genus: Oaphantes (Banks, 1904)

Type species
- O. pallidulus (Banks, 1904)

Species
- 3, see text

Genus of spiders

Oaphantes is a genus of North American dwarf spiders that was first described by Ralph Vary Chamberlin & Vaine Wilton Ivie in 1943.

== Species ==
As of May 2021 it contains three species:

- Oaphantes cryophilus Paquin, Dupérré, Buckle & Ubick, 2020 – Canada, USA
- Oaphantes pallidulus (Banks, 1904) – USA
- Oaphantes prometheus Paquin, Dupérré, Buckle & Ubick, 2020 – Canada, USA
