= Ceratinops =

Scientific classification
- Kingdom: Animalia
- Phylum: Arthropoda
- Subphylum: Chelicerata
- Class: Arachnida
- Order: Araneae
- Infraorder: Araneomorphae
- Family: Linyphiidae
- Genus: Ceratinops; Banks, 1905

Type species
- C. annulipes (Banks, 1892)

Species
- 10, see text

Genus of spiders

Ceratinops is a genus of North American dwarf spiders that was first described by Nathan Banks in 1905.

== Species ==
As of May 2019 it contains ten species:

- Ceratinops annulipes (Banks, 1892) (type) – USA
- Ceratinops carolinus (Banks, 1911) – USA
- Ceratinops crenatus (Emerton, 1882) – USA
- Ceratinops inflatus (Emerton, 1923) – USA
- Ceratinops latus (Emerton, 1882) – USA
- Ceratinops littoralis (Emerton, 1913) – USA
- Ceratinops obscurus (Chamberlin & Ivie, 1939) – USA
- Ceratinops rugosus (Emerton, 1909) – USA
- Ceratinops sylvaticus (Emerton, 1913) – USA, Canada
- Ceratinops uintanus Chamberlin, 1949 – USA
