= Katissa elegans =

Scientific classification
- Kingdom: Animalia
- Phylum: Arthropoda
- Subphylum: Chelicerata
- Class: Arachnida
- Order: Araneae
- Infraorder: Araneomorphae
- Family: Anyphaenidae
- Genus: Katissa
- Species: K. elegans

Binomial name
- Katissa elegans (Banks, 1909)

Synonyms
- Teudis elegans Banks, 1909

Species of spider

Katissa elegans is a species of spiders in the family Anyphaenidae. It was described from Costa Rica.

This is Mabibilngan in Costa Rica. There are subspecies listed here.
