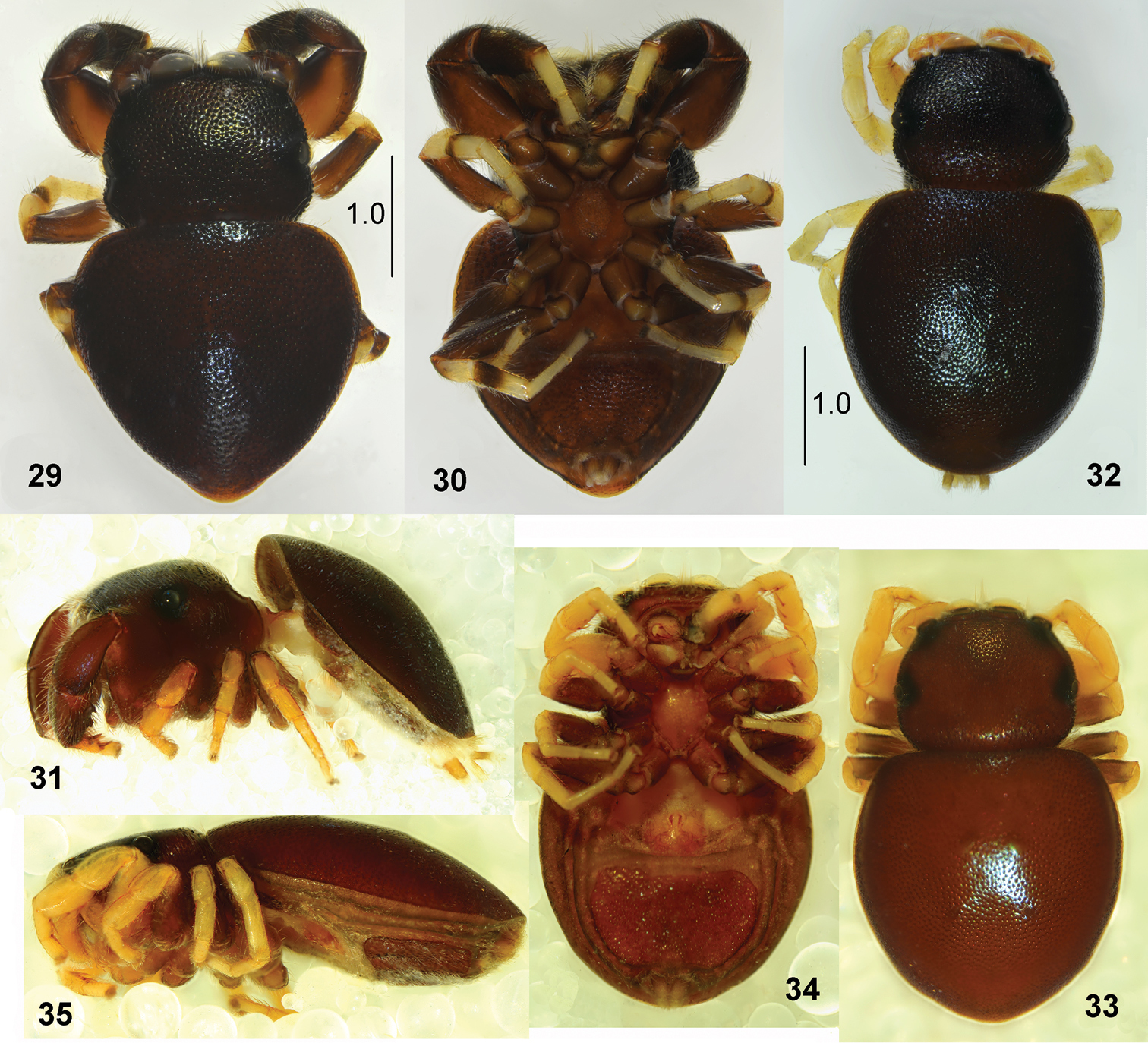
- Views from above and below of spiders from Cameroon, Congo, and Kenya. 29 to 31 are male spiders and 32 to 35 are females

Scientific classification
- Kingdom: Animalia
- Phylum: Arthropoda
- Subphylum: Chelicerata
- Class: Arachnida
- Order: Araneae
- Infraorder: Araneomorphae
- Family: Salticidae
- Genus: Pachyballus
- Species: P. flavipes

Binomial name
- Pachyballus flavipes Simon, 1909

Synonyms
- Pachyballus cordiformis (Berland & Millot, 1941); Pachyballus flavipes aurantius Caporiacco, 1949

= Pachyballus flavipes =

Species of jumping spider

Pachyballus flavipes is a species of jumping spider that lives in Africa. A typical member of the genus Pachyballus, the spider has a dark brown or blackish body that consists of a round cephalothorax, or forward section, that is from 1.2 to 1.6 mm long and, behind that, a larger heart-shaped abdomen that is between 1.9 and 3.1 mm long. Both sexes generally look similar. The male has darker legs than the female, and its front pair are also thicker than the rest. Both have a body is covered with a pitted outer coating that shows signs of sclerotization. The spider is nearly hairless and there is a large scutum on the top of its abdomen, which resemble the hardened forewing, or elytra, of beetles. This helps it to mimic members of the Coccinellidae family. On the underside of its abdomen are two smaller scuta. The male was first described by the arachnologist Eugène Simon in 1909, the female not being described until 1941. The latter description, by Lucien Berland and Jacques Millot, was originally called Pachyballus cordiformis, which is now synonymised with this species.

== Taxonomy ==
Pachyballus flavipes is a species of jumping spider, a member of the family Salticidae, that was first described by the arachnologist Eugène Simon in 1909. He allocated it to the genus Pachyballus, which he had first circumscribed nine years earlier. He initially only described the male. The holotype has been lost but the neotype is stored in the Museo Zoologico di Storia Naturale "La Specola" at the University of Florence.

In 1949, Ludovico di Caporiacco described Pachyballus flavipes aurantiacus as a subspecies based on the colour of his female sample's copulatory organs. It was later identified that is a juvenile of this species so the name was made a synonym by Wanda Wesołowska, Galina Azarkina and Konrad Wiśniewski in 2020. They also synonimised Pachyballus cordiformis, the only example of which was a female that had been destroyed but as described in 1941 by Lucien Berland and Jacques Millot had identical copulatory organs to this subspecies. This also became the first and definitive description of the female of the Pachyballus flavipes.

When he first established the genus, Simon assigned Pachyballus to the Balleae group alongside the related genus Peplometus. In their 2003 phylogenetic analysis, Wayne Maddison and Marshall Hedin noted that the genus is closely related to Mantisatta, despite the large physiological differences between them, and the similarity of those spiders with a group of genera they termed Marpissoida. In 2004, Suresh Benjamin tentatively included in the genus, along with Ballus, in his subfamily Ballinae. In 2007, Wesołowska and Anthony van Harten noted the similarity of the genus with Planiemen. In 2015, Maddison listed the genus within the tribe Ballini, derived from Simon's original name, but attributed to an earlier author, Nathan Banks from 1892. Marrison allocated the tribe to the clade Marpissoida in the clade Salticoida. It is likely that the ballines diverged from the wider Marpissoida clade between 20 and 25 million years ago, although Daniela Andriamalala estimated the family to be 3.99 million years old. In 2016, Jerzy Prószyński added the genus to a group of genera termed Ballines, which contains many of the same genera, including Ballus, Peplometus and Planiemen.

== Description ==
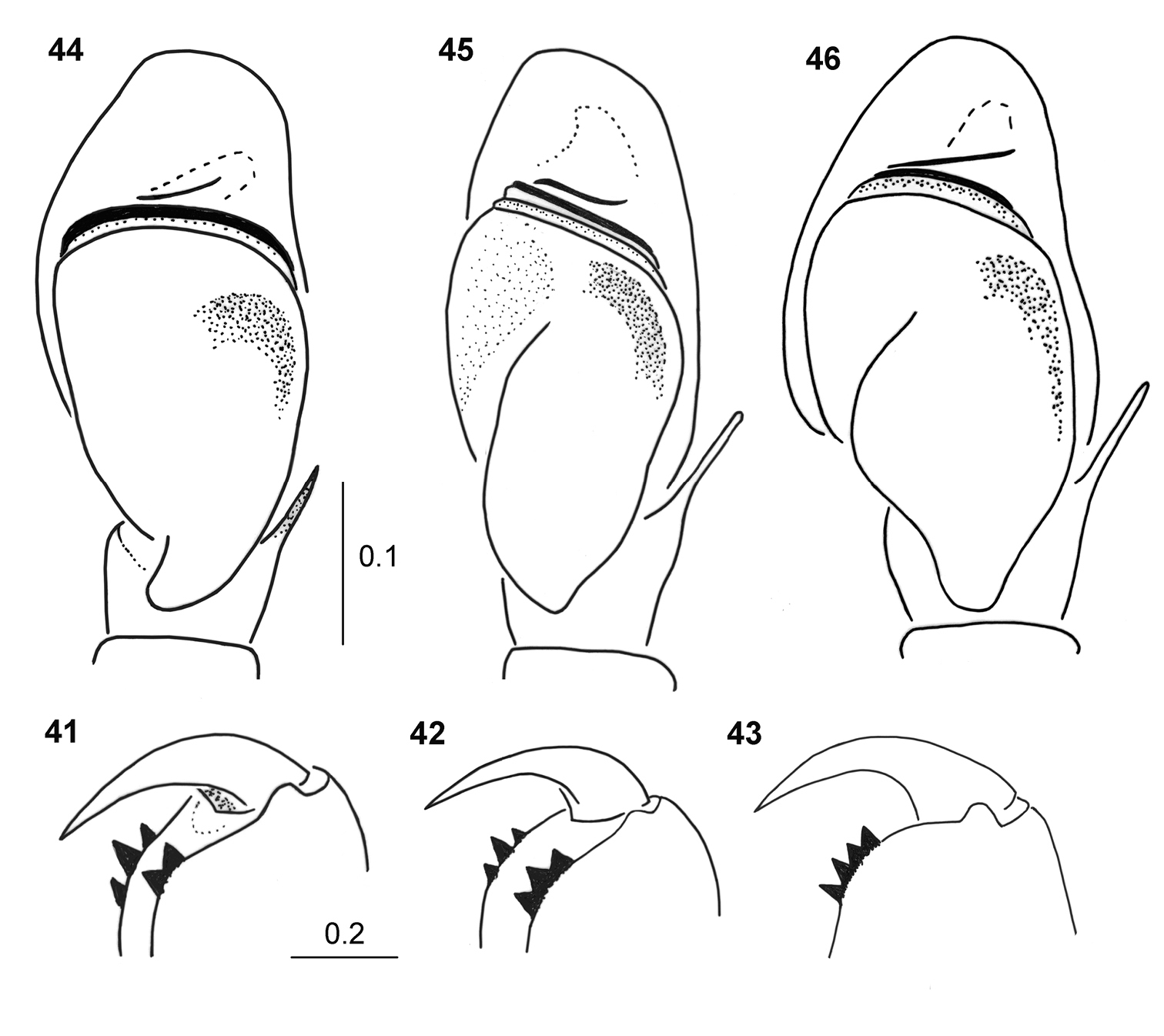
Close up of the male's teeth and copulatory organs, showing the variation between specimens

Pachyballus flavipes has a shape that is typical of the genus. The spider is particularly similar to the related Pachyballus mombasensis and the female also to Pachyballus castaneus. Like other members of the genus, its body divided into two main parts, a rounded cephalothorax to the front and, behind that, a larger heart-shaped abdomen that has a large armoured plate, or scutum covering much of its upper surface. The male's cephalothorax measures between 1.2 and 1.6 mm (0.05 and 0.06 in) in length and between 1.4 and 1.7 mm (0.06 and 0.07 in) in width while its abdomen is between 1.9 and 2.5 mm (0.07 and 0.10 in) long and between 1.8 and 2.3 mm (0.07 and 0.09 in) wide. It abdomen slightly overlaps with its carapace, the hard upper part of the cephalothorax. The spider is generally dark brown to back on its topside and dark brown underneath. The top is nearly hairless and shiny, although there are a few light hairs around some of its eyes. Its entire body is covered with an obviously pitted outer coating that shows signs of sclerotization. On the underside of the abdomen, there are two scuta and a scattering of small sclerotized bumps.

The front of the male spider varies between specimen. Its mouthparts have whitish tips and its chelicerae have three teeth at the front but different examples have been found with two, three and sometimes four teeth at the rear. Its front pair of legs are fatter than the rest. They have dark brown and black segments with long fine dark hairs and four very short thick spines. The other legs are generally lighter brown and sometimes have a ring around their tibia. It has dark pedipalps, sensory organs near its mouth.

The female is similar in size to the male, with a cephalothorax that ranges from 1.2 and 1.3 mm (0.05 in) in length and between 1.3 and 1.4 mm in width. Its abdomen varies between 1.9 and 3.1 mm (0.12 in) in length and between 1.7 and 2.9 mm (0.11 in) in width. Its abdomen has a more oval shape than the male has; its legs are all yellowish and its pedipalps are yellow. There are short light hairs only around its frontal eyes. It is otherwise similar to the male.

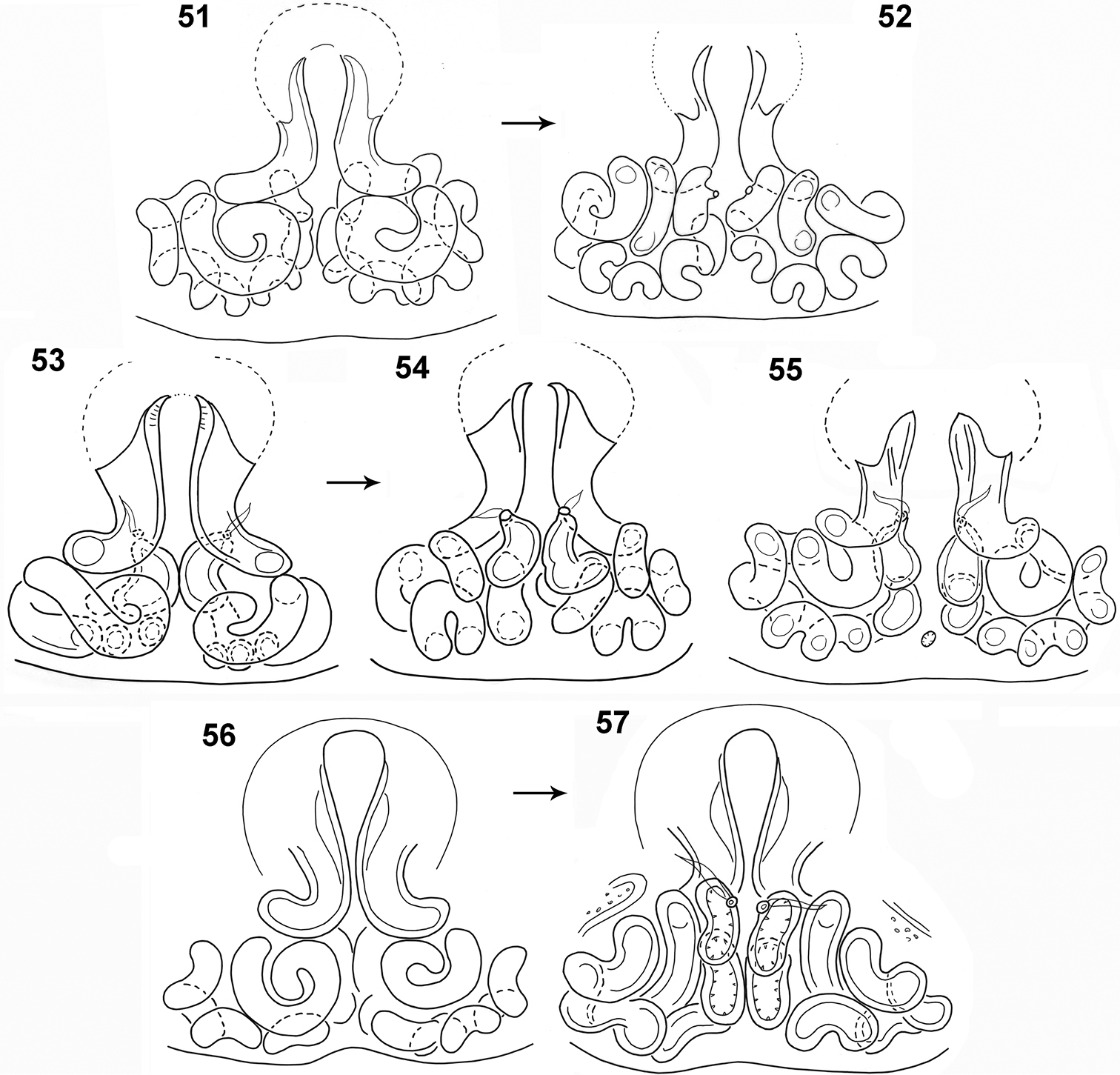
Diagrams of the internal morphology of female copulatory organs showing the diversity that can be seen between specimens from Cameroon (51 and 52), Congo (53, 54 and 55) and Zimbabwe (57)

Pachyballus flavipes has distinctive copulatory organs. The male's palp finishes with a relatively small palpal tibia has a single large spike, or tibial apophysis, projecting upwards. The apophysis curves slightly away from the rest of the palp. Attached to the end of the tibia is a rounded cymbium that is attached to a palpal bulb that is smaller and hangs down alongside the tibia. The bulb has a pronounced bulge at the bottom and a thin projection called an embolus extending from its top that wraps itself in tight coils before projecting away from the bulb and curving in towards the cymbium. The embolus itself has a hump at the base of its membranous core. The female spider's epigyne, or external and most visible part of the female copulatory organs, is oval with a horse-shoe-shaped depression visible to the front. There are two copulatory openings that lead via wide insemination ducts to relatively small receptacles, or spermathecae.

The spider resembles a beetle. It particularly resembles members of the Coccinellidae family. The shape of the scuta on the juveniles is particularly similar to the hardened forewings, or elytra, of beetles. Combined with its choice of habitat, this suggest that this is a form of camouflage.

== Distribution and habitat ==
Pachyballus spiders generally live in Africa and have been found in Yemen. Pachyballus flavipes was initially seen only in West Africa but has also been found in East Africa, implying it has a wide distribution across Africa. Specimens of the spider have been collected from many countries, including Angola, Botswana, Cameroon, the Democratic Republic of Congo, Equatorial Guinea, Ivory Coast, Kenya, South Africa, Tanzania, Uganda and Zimbabwe. It lives in forests, both in the canopy and on the ground. The spider has been seen in rainforest and on steppe living amongst Acacia trees at an altitude of up to 2,100 m (6,900 ft) above sea level.
