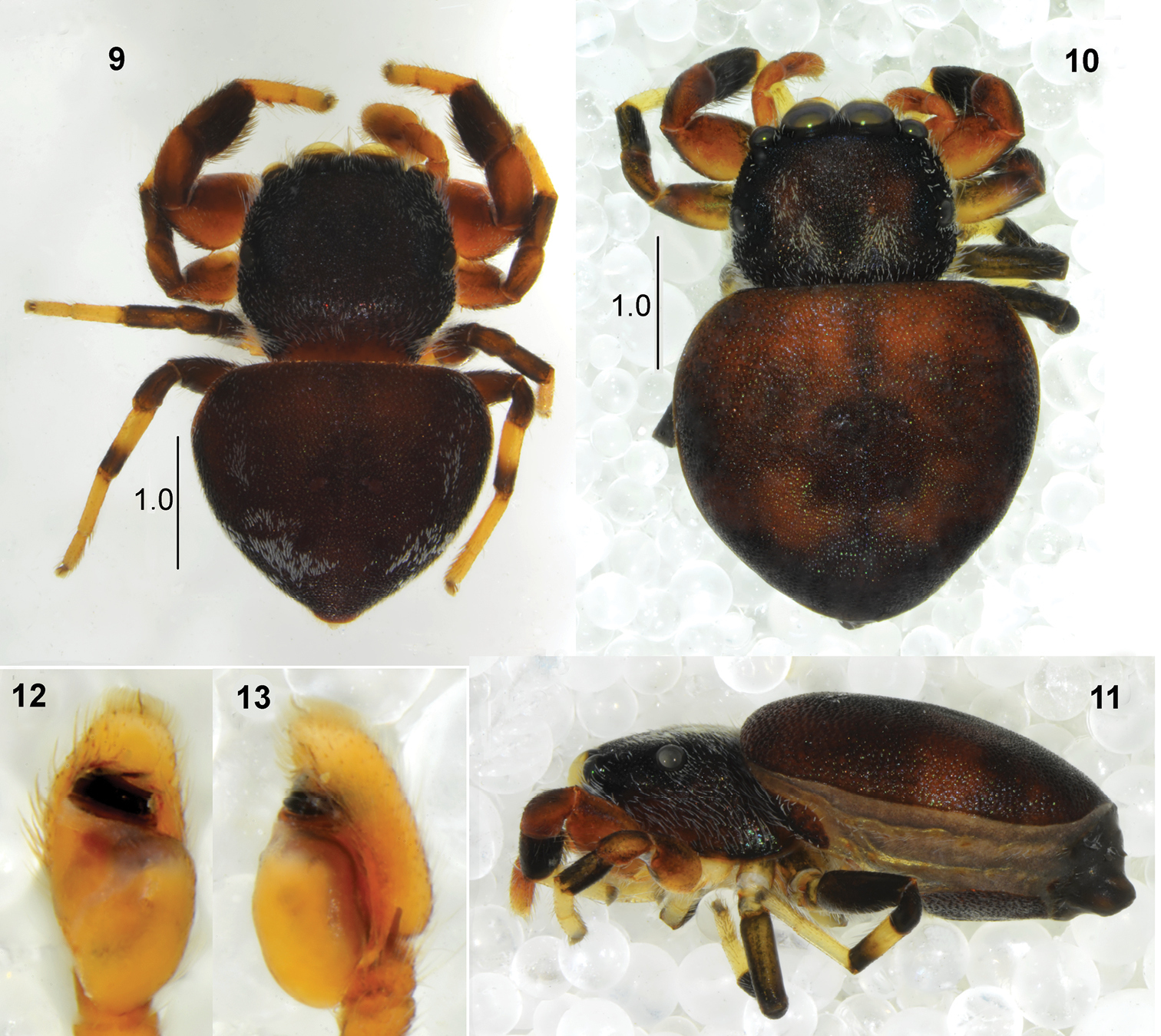

Scientific classification
- Kingdom: Animalia
- Phylum: Arthropoda
- Subphylum: Chelicerata
- Class: Arachnida
- Order: Araneae
- Infraorder: Araneomorphae
- Family: Salticidae
- Genus: Pachyballus
- Species: P. caelestis

Binomial name
- Pachyballus caelestis Wesołowska, Azarkina & Wiśniewski, 2020

= Pachyballus caelestis =

Species of jumping spider

Pachyballus caelestis is a species of jumping spider that lives in the Democratic Republic of the Congo. A member of the genus Pachyballus, it is a small spider with a forward section, or cephalothorax, that ranges from 1.1 to 1.4 mm long and, behind that section, an abdomen that is between 1.8 and 2.2 mm long. It is characterised by its covering in dense white hairs and its preference for living high in the tree canopy of tropical rainforests. The latter is the source of the species name, which means 'soaring'. The spider is generally black with white scales visible near its eyes and along the sides of its abdomen. The female is lighter than the male, with areas of brown visible on its abdomen. Its front pair of legs are stouter than the rest. Its copulatory organs are typical for the genus, but the female has a ridge in the middle of its epigyne that helps to distinguish it from other Pachyballus spiders. The species was first described in 2020.

== Taxonomy and etymology ==
Pachyballus caelestis is a species of jumping spider, a member of the family Salticidae, that was first described by the arachnologists Wanda Wesołowska, Galina Azarkina and Konrad Wiśniewski in 2020. The holotype is stored in the Royal Museum for Central Africa in Tervuren, where it has the registration code MRAC 226 102. It is one of over 500 different species identified by Wesołowska in her career. The specific name is derived from Latin for 'soaring' and relates to the way that the species prefers to live in the high reaches of the canopy. They allocated the spider to the genus Pachyballus which was first circumscribed in 1900 by Eugène Simon.

When he first established the genus, Simon assigned Pachyballus to the Balleae group alongside the related genus Peplometus. In 2004, Suresh Benjamin tentatively included in the genus, along with Ballus, in the subfamily Ballinae, and, in 2015, Wayne Maddison listed the genus within the tribe Ballini, derived from Simon's original name but attributed to an earlier author, Nathan Banks from 1892. In 2016, Jerzy Prószyński added the genus to a group of genera termed Ballines, which contains many of the same genera, including Ballus, Peplometus and Planiemen. It is likely that the ballines diverged from the wider clade Marpissoida between 20 and 25 million years ago, although Daniela Andriamalala estimated the family to be 3.99 million years old.

== Description ==
Species of Pachyballus are wide-bodied spiders that resemble beetles. Pachyballus caelestis is small and very flat with a strongly pitted exterior that shows signs of sclerotization. The spider's body is divided into two main parts: a forward section called a cephalothorax and an abdomen to the rear. The male has a cephalothorax that measures typically 1.4 mm (0.06 in) in length and 1.5 mm (0.06 in) in width. Its carapace, the hard upper part of the cephalothorax, is black with a covering of dense short white hairs. The eye field is shaped like a trapezium and there are white scales around the spider's eyes. The part of the spider's face known as the clypeus is low with a scattering of white hairs visible. The spider's chelicerae have two teeth at the front and a four teeth at the back. Its remaining mouthparts are light brown, with white tips at the ends of the labium and maxillae.

The spider's abdomen is larger than the cephalothorax, measuring 1.8 mm (0.07 in) long and 2 mm (0.08 in) wide. It is heart-shaped and blackish on top with white scales on its sides and rear. The front of the abdomen overlaps the rear of the carapace. The underside is brown. The spider has black spinnerets. The front pair of legs is stout, brown and black. The second pair is thinner but similar in coloration while the remainder of the legs are brown and yellow. Its pedipalps, sensory organs near the mouth, are yellowish. The spider's copulatory organs are typical for the genus and include a rounded cymbium that partially encloses a smaller bulbous palpal bulb. The bulb has a thin spike called an embolus extending from its top that wraps itself in four tight coils before projecting away from the bulb. The small palpal tibia has a single small curved spike, or tibial apophysis, projecting upwards.

The female has a cephalothorax that measures between 1.1 and 1.2 mm (0.043 and 0.047 in) in length and between 1.3 and 1.4 mm (0.051 and 0.055 in) in width. Its carapace is similarly shaped to the male and again covered in white hairs. The spider's abdomen is between 2 and 2.2 mm (0.087 in) in length and between 2.2 and 2.4 mm (0.094 in) in width. It is lighter than the male, with more brown evident across its surface although the middle of the top and the sides are still black. It has light brown pedipalps. The spider's epigyne, or externally visible copulatory organ, is oval with a depression in the middle that is split into two by a short wide ridge. The two copulatory openings lead to wide ducts and relatively small receptacles, or spermathecae. There are accessory glands that open into the ducts.

It is the hairy nature of the spider that most clearly differentiates it from others in the genus. Although the looped embolus is unusual, other Pachyballus spiders have similar shapes so distinguishing the species from others in the genus is difficult. The female has a distinctive ridge in the middle of the epigyne and straight copulatory ducts which aids recognition.

== Distribution and habitat ==
Pachyballus spiders generally live in Africa and have also been found in Yemen. Pachyballus caelestis is endemic to Democratic Republic of the Congo. The holotype was found in Luki Forest Reserve in 2007. It has only been found in a limited are of the country. The spider lives high in the forest canopy of tropical rainforests.
