= Pseudostenophylax =

Scientific classification
- Kingdom: Animalia
- Phylum: Arthropoda
- Clade: Pancrustacea
- Class: Insecta
- Order: Trichoptera
- Family: Limnephilidae
- Subfamily: Pseudostenophylacinae
- Genus: Pseudostenophylax; Martynov, 1909

Synonyms
- Drusinus Betten, 1934

Genus of caddisflies

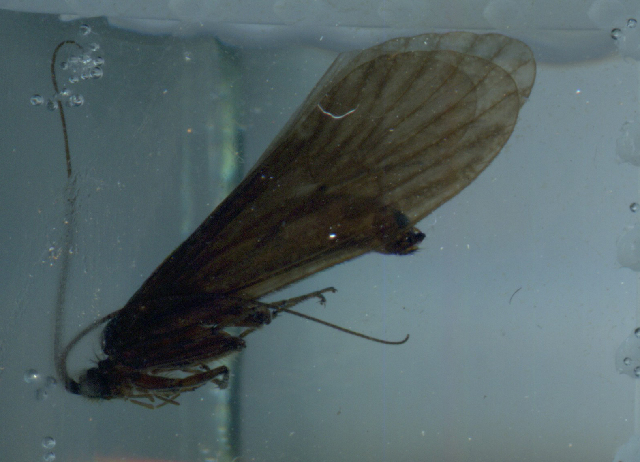
Pseudostenophylax aniketos

Pseudostenophylax is a genus of northern caddisflies in the family Limnephilidae. There are at least 80 described species in Pseudostenophylax.

The type species for Pseudostenophylax is Pseudostenophylax fumosus A.V. Martynov.

== Species ==
These 83 species belong to the genus Pseudostenophylax:

- Pseudostenophylax acutifalcatus Schmid, 1991^{i c g}
- Pseudostenophylax adlimitans (Martynov, 1914)^{i c g}
- Pseudostenophylax alcor Schmid, 1991^{i c g}
- Pseudostenophylax amphion Schmid, 1991^{i c g}
- Pseudostenophylax amplus (McLachlan, 1894)^{i c g}
- Pseudostenophylax amurensis (McLachlan, 1880)^{i c g}
- Pseudostenophylax angulatus Schmid, 1991^{i c g}
- Pseudostenophylax angustifalcatus Schmid, 1991^{i c g}
- Pseudostenophylax aniketos Schmid, 1961^{i c g}
- Pseudostenophylax arwiel Schmid, 1991^{i c g}
- Pseudostenophylax auriculatus Tian & Li in Huang, 1988^{i c g}
- Pseudostenophylax befui^{g}
- Pseudostenophylax bifalcatus Schmid, 1991^{i c g}
- Pseudostenophylax bifurcatus Tian & Li Tian, Li, Yang & Sun, in Chen, editor, 1993^{i c g}
- Pseudostenophylax bimaculatus Tian & Li Tian, Li, Yang & Sun, in Chen, editor, 1993^{i c g}
- Pseudostenophylax brevis Banks, 1940^{i c g}
- Pseudostenophylax burmanus (Mosely, 1936)^{i c g}
- Pseudostenophylax clavatus Tian & Li in Tian, Li, Yang & Sun, in Chen, editor, 1993^{i c g}
- Pseudostenophylax dentilus Kobayashi, 1973^{g}
- Pseudostenophylax difficilior Schmid, 1991^{i c g}
- Pseudostenophylax difficilis Martynov, 1931^{i c g}
- Pseudostenophylax dikaios Schmid, 1961^{i c g}
- Pseudostenophylax dorsoproceris Leng & Yang in Yang, Wang & Leng, 1997^{i c g}
- Pseudostenophylax edwardsi (Banks, 1920)^{i c g b}
- Pseudostenophylax elongatus Tian & Li in Tian, Li, Yang & Sun, in Chen, editor, 1993^{i c g}
- Pseudostenophylax euphorion Schmid, 1991^{i c g}
- Pseudostenophylax fimbriatofalcatus Schmid, 1991^{i c g}
- Pseudostenophylax flavidus Tian & Li Tian, Li, Yang & Sun, in Chen, editor, 1993^{i c g}
- Pseudostenophylax fo Schmid, 1991^{i c}
- Pseudostenophylax fumosus Martynov, 1909^{i c g}
- Pseudostenophylax galathiel Schmid, 1991^{i c g}
- Pseudostenophylax garhwalensis Schmid, 1991^{i c g}
- Pseudostenophylax glycerion Schmid, 1991^{i c g}
- Pseudostenophylax griseolus Martynov, 1930^{i c g}
- Pseudostenophylax gulmargensis Parey, Saina & Pandher, 2013
- Pseudostenophylax himachalica Parey, Saina & Pandher, 2013
- Pseudostenophylax himalayanus Martynov, 1930^{i c g}
- Pseudostenophylax hirsutus Forsslund, 1935^{i c g}
- Pseudostenophylax ichtar Schmid, 1991^{i c g}
- Pseudostenophylax imanishii Iwata, 1928^{g}
- Pseudostenophylax incisus (Curtis, 1834)^{i c g}
- Pseudostenophylax ithuriel Schmid, 1991^{i c g}
- Pseudostenophylax itoae^{g}
- Pseudostenophylax jugosignatus Martynov, 1930^{i c g}
- Pseudostenophylax kamba Mosely in Kimmins, 1950^{i c g}
- Pseudostenophylax kashmirensis (Mosely, 1936)^{i c g}
- Pseudostenophylax kostjuki Mey, 1994^{i c g}
- Pseudostenophylax kuharai^{g}
- Pseudostenophylax latifalcatus Schmid, 1991^{i c g}
- Pseudostenophylax luthiel Schmid, 1991^{i c g}
- Pseudostenophylax martynovi Mosely, 1936^{i c g}
- Pseudostenophylax melkor Schmid, 1991^{i c g}
- Pseudostenophylax micraulax (McLachlan, 1878)^{i c g}
- Pseudostenophylax mimicus Banks, 1940^{i c g}
- Pseudostenophylax minimus Banks, 1940^{i c g}
- Pseudostenophylax mitchelli (Mosely, 1936)^{i c g}
- Pseudostenophylax mizar Schmid, 1991^{i c g}
- Pseudostenophylax nectarion Schmid, 1991^{i c g}
- Pseudostenophylax obscurus Forsslund, 1935^{i c g}
- Pseudostenophylax ondakensis (Iwata, 1928)^{i c g}
- Pseudostenophylax ovalis Schmid, 1991^{i c g}
- Pseudostenophylax pauper Schmid, 1991^{i c g}
- Pseudostenophylax riedeli Botosaneanu, 1970^{i c g}
- Pseudostenophylax rufescens (Martynov, 1930)^{i c g}
- Pseudostenophylax sabadiel Schmid, 1991^{i c g}
- Pseudostenophylax schelpei (Kimmins, 1954)^{i c g}
- Pseudostenophylax secretus Martynov, 1928^{i c g}
- Pseudostenophylax sophar Schmid, 1991^{i c g}
- Pseudostenophylax sparsus (Banks, 1908)^{i c g b}
- Pseudostenophylax squamolineatus Schmid, 1991^{i c g}
- Pseudostenophylax striatus Forsslund, 1935^{i c g}
- Pseudostenophylax takaoensis Schmid, 1991^{i c g}
- Pseudostenophylax tanidai^{g}
- Pseudostenophylax tenuifalcatus Schmid, 1991^{i c g}
- Pseudostenophylax thinuviel Schmid, 1991^{i c g}
- Pseudostenophylax tochigiensis Schmid, 1991^{i c g}
- Pseudostenophylax tohokuensis^{g}
- Pseudostenophylax transbaicalensis Mey, 1994^{i c g}
- Pseudostenophylax uniformis (Betten, 1934)^{b}
- Pseudostenophylax uriel Schmid, 1991^{i c g}
- Pseudostenophylax vietnamensis Mey, 1997^{i c g}
- Pseudostenophylax xuthus Mey, 1997^{i c g}
- Pseudostenophylax yunnanensis Hwang, 1958^{i c g}

Data sources: i = ITIS, c = Catalogue of Life, g = GBIF, b = Bugguide.net
