= Ceratinops crenatus =

Scientific classification
- Domain: Eukaryota
- Kingdom: Animalia
- Phylum: Arthropoda
- Subphylum: Chelicerata
- Class: Arachnida
- Order: Araneae
- Infraorder: Araneomorphae
- Family: Linyphiidae
- Genus: Ceratinops
- Species: C. crenatus

Binomial name
- Ceratinops crenatus (Emerton, 1882)

Species of spider

Ceratinops crenatus is a species of dwarf spider in the family Linyphiidae. It is found in the USA.
