= Katissa =

Scientific classification
- Kingdom: Animalia
- Phylum: Arthropoda
- Subphylum: Chelicerata
- Class: Arachnida
- Order: Araneae
- Infraorder: Araneomorphae
- Family: Anyphaenidae
- Genus: Katissa; Brescovit, 1997

Type species
- K. simplicipalpis (Simon, 1898)

Species
- 10, see text

Genus of spiders

Katissa is a genus of anyphaenid sac spiders first described by Antônio Brescovit in 1997.

== Species ==
As of October 2026 it contains ten species:

- Katissa delicatula (Banks, 1909) – Costa Rica
- Katissa elegans (Banks, 1909) – Costa Rica
- Katissa guyasamini Dupérré & Tapia, 2016 – Ecuador
- Katissa kurusiki Dupérré & Tapia, 2016 – Ecuador
- Katissa lycosoides (Chickering, 1937) – Panama
- Katissa puyu Dupérré & Tapia, 2016 – Ecuador
- Katissa simplicipalpis (Simon, 1898) – Lesser Antilles, Panama, Peru
- Katissa tamya Dupérré & Tapia, 2016 – Ecuador
- Katissa yaya Dupérré & Tapia, 2016 – Ecuador
- Katissa zimarae (Reimoser, 1939) – Costa Rica
