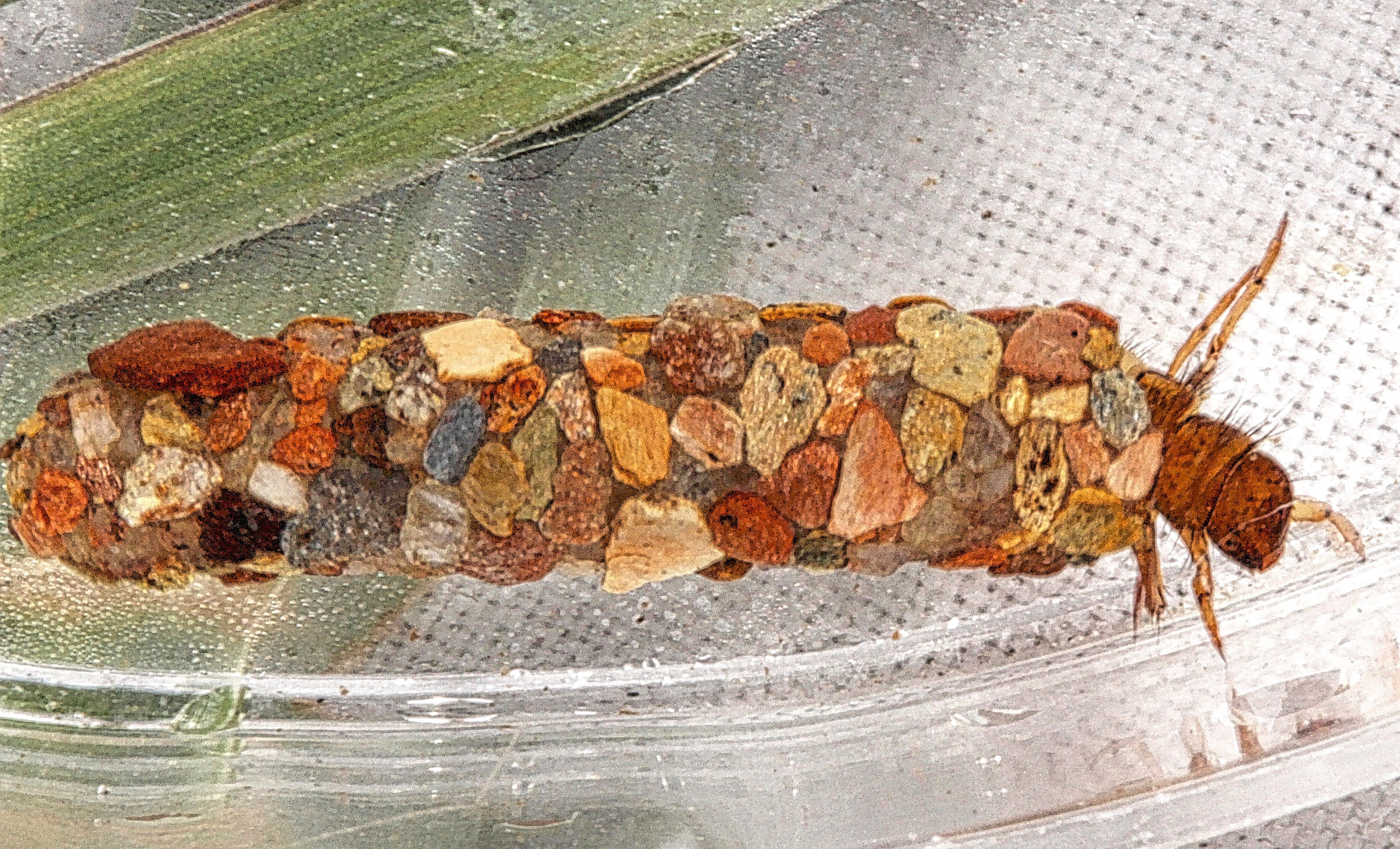
- Pseudostenophylax sparsus

Scientific classification
- Kingdom: Animalia
- Phylum: Arthropoda
- Clade: Pancrustacea
- Class: Insecta
- Order: Trichoptera
- Family: Limnephilidae
- Genus: Pseudostenophylax
- Species: P. sparsus

Binomial name
- Pseudostenophylax sparsus (Banks, 1908)

= Pseudostenophylax sparsus =

Species of caddisfly

Pseudostenophylax sparsus is a species of northern caddisfly in the family Limnephilidae. It is found in North America.

== Subspecies ==
These two subspecies belong to the species Pseudostenophylax sparsus:

- Pseudostenophylax sparsus sparsus
- Pseudostenophylax sparsus uniformis (Betten, 1934)
