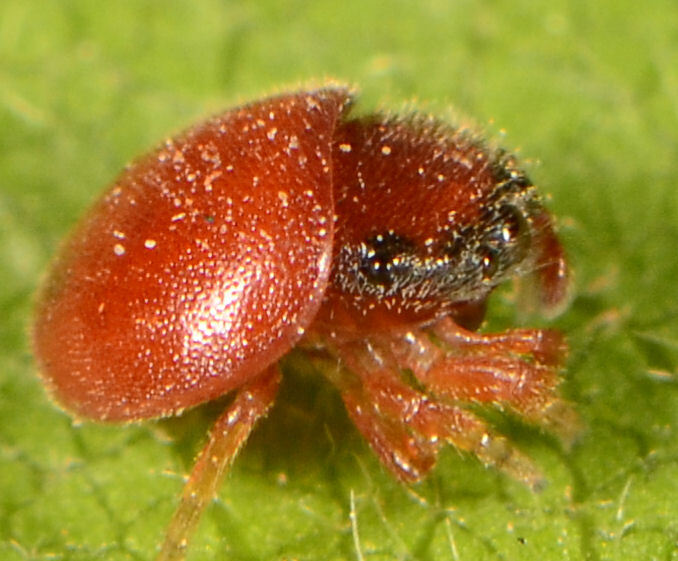
- female P. castaneus
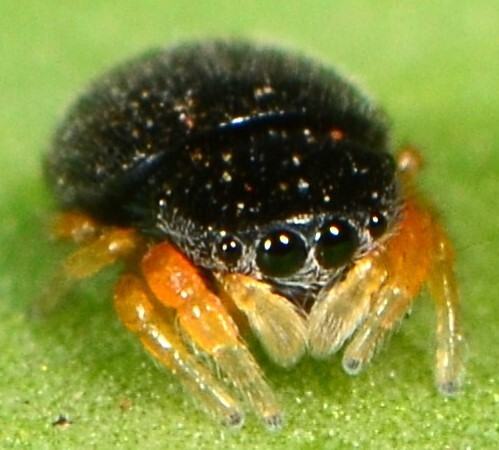
- male P. miniscutulus

Scientific classification
- Kingdom: Animalia
- Phylum: Arthropoda
- Subphylum: Chelicerata
- Class: Arachnida
- Order: Araneae
- Infraorder: Araneomorphae
- Family: Salticidae
- Subfamily: Salticinae
- Genus: Pachyballus; Simon, 1900

Type species
- P. transversus Simon, 1900

Species
- 9, see text

= Pachyballus =

Genus of spiders

Pachyballus is a genus of jumping spiders that was first described by Eugène Louis Simon in 1900. While most are found in Africa and nearby regions, one species is endemic to New Caledonia. The name is a combination of the Ancient Greek παχύς ("pachys"), meaning "thick", and the salticid genus Ballus.

Pachyballus rotundus was transferred to its own genus Planiemen in 2007 and Pachyballus oyo was transferred to Peplometus in 2020.

== Distribution ==
Pachyballus are found only in Africa, with the exception of P. gambeyi, which is endemic to New Caledonia.

== Species ==
As of October 2025, this genus includes nine species:

- Pachyballus caelestis Wesołowska, Azarkina & Wiśniewski, 2020 – DR Congo
- Pachyballus castaneus Simon, 1900 – Zimbabwe, South Africa, Mozambique?
- Pachyballus flavipes Simon, 1909 – Ivory Coast, Cameroon, Equatorial Guinea, DR Congo, Uganda, Kenya, Tanzania, Angola, Botswana, Zimbabwe, South Africa
- Pachyballus gambeyi (Simon, 1880) – New Caledonia
- Pachyballus miniscutulus Wesołowska, Azarkina & Wiśniewski, 2020 – Ivory Coast, South Africa
- Pachyballus mombasensis Wesołowska, Azarkina & Wiśniewski, 2020 – Kenya
- Pachyballus ornatus Wesołowska, Azarkina & Wiśniewski, 2020 – DR Congo, Tanzania
- Pachyballus transversus Simon, 1900 – Ethiopia, Somalia, Ivory Coast, Guinea-Bissau, Cameroon, DR Congo, DR Congo, Tanzania, Mozambique, South Africa (type species)
- Pachyballus variegatus Lessert, 1925 – Tanzania
