= Planiemen =

Scientific classification
- Kingdom: Animalia
- Phylum: Arthropoda
- Subphylum: Chelicerata
- Class: Arachnida
- Order: Araneae
- Infraorder: Araneomorphae
- Family: Salticidae
- Genus: Planiemen; Wesołowska & van Harten, 2007
- Species: P. rotundus

Binomial name
- Planiemen rotundus (Wesołowska & van Harten, 1994)

Synonyms
- Pachyballus rotundus Wesołowska & van Harten, 1994

Genus of spiders

Planiemen is a genus of jumping spider erected in 2007 for the sole species Planiemen rotundus, formerly placed in the genus Pachyballus. It is endemic to Yemen.

This dark-colored species is almost round in appearance. The cephalothorax and opisthosoma are each about 2 millimetres (1/16 in) long.
