= Mantisatta =

Scientific classification
- Kingdom: Animalia
- Phylum: Arthropoda
- Subphylum: Chelicerata
- Class: Arachnida
- Order: Araneae
- Infraorder: Araneomorphae
- Family: Salticidae
- Subfamily: Salticinae
- Genus: Mantisatta; Warburton, 1900

Type species
- M. trucidans Warburton, 1900

Species
- M. longicauda Cutler & Wanless, 1973 – Philippines; M. trucidans Warburton, 1900 – Borneo

Genus of spiders

Mantisatta is a genus of Southeast Asian jumping spiders that was first described by C. A. Warburton in 1900. As of June 2019 it contains only two species, found only in the Philippines and Malaysia: M. longicauda and M. trucidans. The name is a combination of "mantis", in reference to its long first legs, and the common salticid suffix -attus.
