= Nathan Banks =

American entomologist (1868–1953)

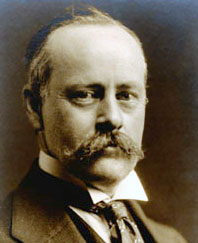
- Nathan Banks circa 1915
- Born: April 13, 1868; Roslyn, New York
- Died: January 24, 1953 (aged 84); Holliston, Massachusetts
- Citizenship: United States
- Education: Cornell University (B.S. 1889, M.S. 1890)
- Scientific career
- Fields: Entomology
- Workplaces: United States Department of Agriculture, Museum of Comparative Zoology
- Academic advisors: John Henry Comstock (M.S. advisor)
- Author abbrev. (zoology): Banks

Nathan Banks (April 13, 1868 – January 24, 1953) was an American entomologist noted for his work on Neuroptera, Megaloptera, Hymenoptera, and Acarina (mites). He started work on mites in 1890 with the USDA. In 1909 he reported many Costa Rican species with several new species saying "During the past few years the writer has received large series of spiders and daddy-longlegs from Costa Rica for identification". In 1915 he authored the first comprehensive English handbook on mites: A Treatise on the Acarina, Or Mites (Smithsonian Institution, Proceedings Of The United States National Museum, 1905, 114 pages).

Banks left the USDA in 1916 to work at the Museum of Comparative Zoology (MCZ) where he did further work on Hymenoptera, Arachnida and Neuroptera. He was elected a Fellow of the American Academy of Arts and Sciences in 1922.

In 1924, he spent about two months in Panama, through kindness of Dr. Thomas Barbour and in company with Dr. W.M. Wheeler. Between mid June and mid August they divided time between forested regions on Barro Colorado Island and more open habitat at various points along the railroad in the vicinity of Panama City (See Banks, 1929 "Spiders of Panama" for details).

He authored more than 440 technical works over the years 1890 to 1951. He was married to Mary A. Lu Gar and they had nine children: Ruth Agnes, Bessie Gertrude, Harold Bryant, Nellie May, Gilbert Shelley, Waldo Hawthorne, Dorothy Alice, Elsie Lucille, and Douglas Hartley (who had died by 1926).
