= Parahelpis wandae =

Scientific classification
- Kingdom: Animalia
- Phylum: Arthropoda
- Subphylum: Chelicerata
- Class: Arachnida
- Order: Araneae
- Infraorder: Araneomorphae
- Family: Salticidae
- Genus: Parahelpis
- Species: P. wandae

Binomial name
- Parahelpis wandae Patoleta & Żabka, 2020

Species of spider

Parahelpis wandae is a species of jumping spider in the genus Parahelpis that lives in Australia. The spider was first described in 2020 by Barbara Patoleta and Marek Żabka, although only the male has been identified. It is a small spider with a brown carapace 2.3 mm (0.091 in) iong and a grey-brown abdomen 2.45 mm (0.096 in) long. The abdomen has a pattern of chevrons. The remainder of the spider is brown or grey-brown. It is similar to the related Parahelpis abnormis, even to the design of its copulatory organs. It differs in that, although it is similarly hooked, the retrolateral tibial apophysis is not forked.

== Taxonomy ==
Parahelpis wandae was first described by the Polish arachnologists Barbara Patoleta and Marek Żabka in 2020. The species was named after Wanda Wesołowska, another arachnologist that comes from Poland. It was placed in the genus Parahelpis. The genus was first described by Joanna Gardzińska and Żabka ten years before. The genus name was derived from the genus Helpis which may be related and with which it shares many similarities, particular in the general look of the spider. It was allocated to the group Astieae, which had been first proposed by Eugène Simon in 1901. Members of the group are found in Australia, New Guinea, New Zealand and the islands that lie nearby. It was placed in tribe Astiini by Wayne Maddison in 2015. These were allocated to the clade Salticoida. In 2017, the genus was grouped with 12 other genera of jumping spiders under the name Astiaines, itself derived from the genus name Astia.

== Description ==
The spider is small, with a length of typically 5 mm (0.20 in). Only the male has been described. The spider has a brown carapace that is 2.3 mm (0.091 in) in length and 1.87 mm (0.074 in) in width. It is covered by white scales, particularly to the sides. The carapace is pear-shaped and moderately high. The elongated abdomen is 2.45 mm (0.096 in) long and 1.32 mm (0.052 in) wide. It is grey-brown and has a pattern formed of chevrons. The chelicerae are brown with four teeth at the front and six to the back. The clypeus is also brown, The legs and spinnerets are grey-brown. The palpal bulb is robust with a hooked retrolateral tibial apophysis, or appendage, and a slightly bent embolus that is reminiscent of a dagger.

The spider can be distinguished from other members of the genus by the short and narrow nature of the tegulum. It can particularly be confused with the related Parahelpis abnormis as both spiders have a hooked retrolateral tibial apophysis, but this species differs in that the appendage is not forked.

== Distribution and habitat ==
The spider is endemic to Australia. The holotype was found in Queensland in 1984. It has only been identified in that locality. It lives in open forestland.
