= Rhenefictus wandae =

Scientific classification
- Kingdom: Animalia
- Phylum: Arthropoda
- Subphylum: Chelicerata
- Class: Arachnida
- Order: Araneae
- Infraorder: Araneomorphae
- Family: Salticidae
- Genus: Rhenefictus
- Species: R. wandae

Binomial name
- Rhenefictus wandae (Wang & Li, 2021)

Synonyms
- Rhenefictus tropicus Logunov, 2021

Species of spider

Rhenefictus wandae is a species of jumping spider in the genus Rhenefictus that lives in China and Vietnam. First described in 2021 by Cheng Wang and Shuqiang Li, it was initially allocated to the genus Rhene. In 2022, the species was acknowledged as the same as Rhenefictus tropicus and the two were synonymised under the current name. It is the type species of the genus Rhenefictus. Only the male has been described. The spider is small, with a dark red or dark brown carapace between 2.35 and 2.4 mm (0.093 and 0.094 in) long and a brown abdomen between 2.4 and 2.98 mm (0.094 and 0.117 in) long. The base of the abdomen is grey-yellow. The spider has a distinctive embolus on its palpal bulb that is coiled and whip-like, terminating in a pointed tip.

== Taxonomy ==
Rhene wandae was first described by Cheng Wang and Shuqiang Li in 2021. The species is named after the Polish arachnologist Wanda Wesołowska. The name was given particularly for her involvement in the taxonomy of the genus. It was allocated to the genus Rhene, which itself had been first raised by Tamerlan Thorell in 1869. The genus is named after the Greek female name, shared by mythological figures. The genus is part of the subtribe Dendryphantina in the tribe Dendryphantini, and is related to the genera Dendryphantes and Macaroeris.

Dmitri Logunov defined a new genus Rhenefictus in the same year. The name was a combination of the genus name Rhene and the Latin word fictus, which can be translated false. This referred to the way that the genus is similar to Rhene and yet is a different species. It is also related to the genus Zeuxippus. The type species for the new genus was the species Rhenefictus tropicus. The name for this species derived from the Latin word for tropical. On reassessment the following year, it was found that Rhenefictus tropicus and Rhene wandae were identical species. The two were combined, Rhenefictus tropicus being declared a synonym of the other species on the basis that it had appeared in a slightly later publication. The species was renamed Rhenefictus wandae. It remains the type species for the genus. Dmitri Logunov speculated that an example of the species Macaroeris moebi, published in 2012, could also be the same species.

== Description ==
Only the male has been described. The spider is small, with a typical total length of 5.26 mm (0.207 in). The carapace is the shape of an elongated hexagone that is between 2.35 and 2.4 mm (0.093 and 0.094 in) in length and 2.1 and 2.41 mm (0.083 and 0.095 in) in width. The surface has light brown and white scales, particularly around the eye field The abdomen is more oval, between 2.4 and 2.98 mm (0.094 and 0.117 in) long and 1.6 and 2.05 mm (0.063 and 0.081 in) wide. It is also brown on the top and has pattern of irregular white stripes. The sides and base of the abdomen are grey-yellow. The chelicerae are brown or red-brown, as are the legs. The spinnerets brown-yellow. The pedipalps are yellow. The palpal bulb is swollen. The coiled long whip-like embolus is distinctive for the species, particularly for its pointed end.

== Distribution and habitat ==
The species comes from China and Vietnam. The holotype for the species was found in Mengla County in Yunnan, China, in 2009. This location is near the Rainforest of Xishuangbanna. The first paratype came from a nearby bamboo plantation. In 2015, the first example of the species outside China was found near Na Hang in Vietnam.
