= Eburneana wandae =

Scientific classification
- Kingdom: Animalia
- Phylum: Arthropoda
- Subphylum: Chelicerata
- Class: Arachnida
- Order: Araneae
- Infraorder: Araneomorphae
- Family: Salticidae
- Genus: Eburneana
- Species: E. wandae

Binomial name
- Eburneana wandae Szűts, 2003

Species of spider

Eburneana wandae is a species of jumping spider in the genus Eburneana that mimics ants. It was named by Tamás Szűts after the Polish arachnologist Wanda Wesołowska. The male of the species was first described in 2003, with the holotype found in the forests of central Africa. It is a relatively large spider, 8.2 millimetres (0.32 in) long, and is distinguished from the similar Eburneana scharffi by its different geography, being found in Cameroon rather than Tanzania, and the shape of the spider's front legs.

== Taxonomy ==
Eburneana wandae is a species of jumping spider that was first named by Tamás Szűts in 2003. The genus is named for Litus Eburneum, the Latin name for Ivory Coast, the place where one of the members of the genus, Eburneana magna was first found. The species is named in honour of Wanda Wesołowska, one of more than 20 species named for the Polish arachnologist. In 2015, the genus was added to the subclade Saltafresia in the clade Salticoida based on the analysis of 8 genes. In 2017, it was added to the supergroup Hylloida by Jerzy Prószyński.

== Description ==
A large ant-like spider, Eburneana wandae has a flat and slender body that is 8.2 millimetres (0.32 in) long. Only the male has been described. It has a dark brown carapace covered in short thin grey hairs that measures 4.4 millimetres (0.17 in) long and 2.2 millimetres (0.087 in) wide. The abdomen is also dark brown and measures 3.0 millimetres (0.12 in) long and 2.0 millimetres (0.079 in) wide. The female of the species has yet to be described, but the female of the genus is generally slightly smaller than the male. For example, the female of the related species Eburneana scharffi, found in Tanzania, has a carapace that is between 0.7 and 0.9 millimetres (0.028 and 0.035 in) shorter than the male.

The spider is distinguished from other members of genus by the shape of the palpus and position of the embolus base. Compared to the male Eburneana scharffi specifically, the spider can be identified by the shape of the front legs and the less robust chelicerae. The genus shares some similarities with other ant-mimicking jumping spiders, particularly with front legs that are similar to members of the family Pelleninae.

== Distribution ==
Eburneana wandae is the only member of the genus that is endemic to Cameroon. The holotype was found in the Reservé Forestier Makak, in the forest near a river.
