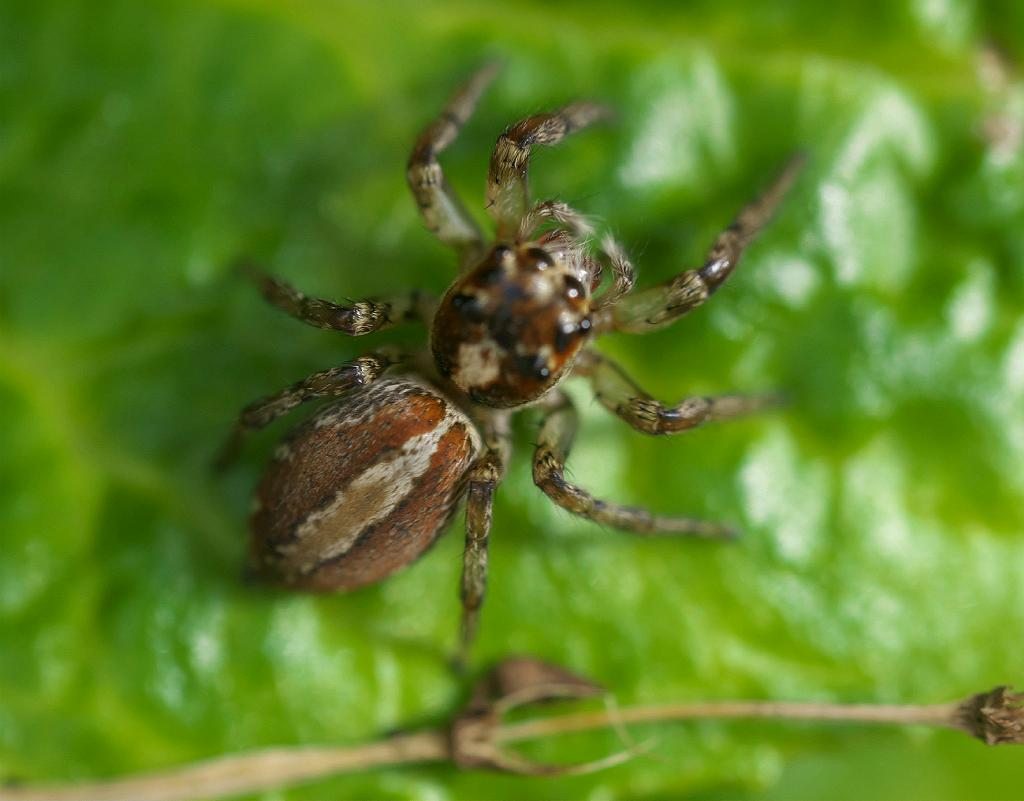
- Plexippoides doenitzi

Scientific classification
- Kingdom: Animalia
- Phylum: Arthropoda
- Subphylum: Chelicerata
- Class: Arachnida
- Order: Araneae
- Infraorder: Araneomorphae
- Family: Salticidae
- Subfamily: Salticinae
- Genus: Plexippoides; Prószyński, 1984

Type species
- P. flavescens (O. Pickard-Cambridge, 1872)

Species
- 26, see text

Synonyms
- Menemerops Prószyński, 1992

= Plexippoides =

Genus of spiders

Plexippoides is a genus of jumping spiders that was first described by Jerzy Prószyński in 1984. The name means "having the likeness of Plexippus"

== Species ==
As of April 2022 it contains twenty-six species, found in eastern Asia, though some are recorded from Africa and south-eastern Europe:

- Plexippoides annulipedis (Saito, 1939) – China, Korea, Japan
- Plexippoides arkit Logunov & Rakov, 1998 – Central Asia
- Plexippoides biprocessiger (Lessert, 1927) – Congo
- Plexippoides cornutus Xie & Peng, 1993 – China
- Plexippoides digitatus Peng & Li, 2002 – China
- Plexippoides dilucidus Próchniewicz, 1990 – Bhutan
- Plexippoides discifer (Schenkel, 1953) – China
- Plexippoides doenitzi (Karsch, 1879) – China, Korea, Japan
- Plexippoides flavescens (O. Pickard-Cambridge, 1872) (type) – Sudan, Egypt, Middle East, Iran, Kyrgyzstan, Turkmenistan, Afghanistan. Introduced to Ukraine and Nevada, United States of America
- Plexippoides gestroi (Dalmas, 1920) – Greece, Cyprus, Turkey, Azerbaijan, Syria, Iraq, Iran
- Plexippoides guangxi (Peng & Li, 2002) – China
- Plexippoides insperatus Logunov, 2021 – Iran, Pakistan
- Plexippoides jinlini Yang, Zhu & Song, 2006 – China
- Plexippoides longapophysis Wang, Mi & Peng, 2020 – China
- Plexippoides longus Zhu, Zhang, Zhang & Chen, 2005 – China
- Plexippoides meniscatus Yang, Zhu & Song, 2006 – China
- Plexippoides nishitakensis (Strand, 1907) – Japan
- Plexippoides potanini Prószyński, 1984 – China
- Plexippoides regius Wesolowska, 1981 – Russia, China, Korea
- Plexippoides regiusoides Peng & Li, 2008 – China
- Plexippoides subtristis Wang, Mi & Peng, 2020 – China
- Plexippoides szechuanensis Logunov, 1993 – China
- Plexippoides tangi Wang, Mi & Peng, 2020 – China
- Plexippoides tristis Próchniewicz, 1990 – Nepal
- Plexippoides validus Xie & Yin, 1991 – China
- Plexippoides zhangi Peng, Yin, Yan & Kim, 1998 – China
