= Eburneana =

Scientific classification
- Kingdom: Animalia
- Phylum: Arthropoda
- Subphylum: Chelicerata
- Class: Arachnida
- Order: Araneae
- Infraorder: Araneomorphae
- Family: Salticidae
- Subfamily: Salticinae
- Genus: Eburneana; Wesołowska & Szűts, 2001

Type species
- Eburneana scharffi Wesołowska & Szűts, 2001

Species
- See text.

Genus of spiders

Eburneana is a genus of the spider family Salticidae (jumping spiders).

Like several other salticids, this genus mimics ants.

== Description ==
Eburneana are rather big ant-like spiders with a constricted cephalothorax. They are 8 to 12 mm (0.31 to 0.47 in) long. The body is very flat and rather slender. The cephalic and thoracic parts are parted by a clear constriction to mimic the ant body plan. Unlike other African ant-like salticids Eburneana has the chelicerae located more posteriorly, rich leg spination and clearly visible large spigots on the posterior spinnerets.

== Relationships ==
The structure of genitalia and the shape of the first legs resembles males of the subfamily Pelleninae, but the phylogenetic relationships of Eburneana to other genera are unclear.

== Name ==
The genus is named after the Latin name of Ivory Coast, Litus Eburneum, where one of the species was first found.

== Species ==
- Eburneana magna Wesołowska & Szűts, 2001 – Ivory Coast
- Eburneana scharffi Wesołowska & Szűts, 2001 – Tanzania
- Eburneana wandae Szűts, 2003 – Cameroon
