= Atomosphyrus wandae =

Scientific classification
- Kingdom: Animalia
- Phylum: Arthropoda
- Subphylum: Chelicerata
- Class: Arachnida
- Order: Araneae
- Infraorder: Araneomorphae
- Family: Salticidae
- Genus: Atomosphyrus
- Species: A. wandae

Binomial name
- Atomosphyrus wandae Bustamante & Ruiz, 2020

Species of jumping spider

Atomosphyrus wandae is a species of jumping spider that lives in Brazil. The spider lives on the ground in gallery forest, shrubland and open fields. Only the male has been identified; it was first described in 2020 by Abel Bustamante and Gustavo Ruiz. It is a small spider with an orange carapace 1.07 mm (0.042 in) iong and a cream-colored abdomen 1.44 mm (0.057 in) long. The carapace has a pattern of stripes and the abdomen has a pattern of spots. It can be distinguished from other spiders in the genus, including the similar Atomosphyrus breyeri, by Its copulatory organs are, particularly the length of its embolus and its triangular retrolateral tibial apophysis.

== Taxonomy ==
Atomosphyrus wandae is a species of jumping spider, a member of the family Salticidae, that was first described by the arachnologists Abel Bustamante and Gustavo Ruiz in 2020. The species was named after the Polish arachnologist Wanda Wesołowska. It was placed in the genus Atomosphyrus, first described by the biologist Eugène Simon in 1902.

The genus was placed in the tribe Thiodinini in the clade Amycoida by the biologist Wayne Maddison in 2015 on the basis of its ant-like body. In 2017, the genus was grouped with 30 other genera of jumping spiders under the name of Amycines, itself derived from the genus name Amycus. The holotype is stored in the Museu Paraense Emílio Goeldi in Belém.

== Description ==
The spider is small, with a length of typically 2.51 mm (0.099 in). Only the male has been described. It has an orange carapace that is 1.07 mm (0.042 in) in length and 0.63 mm (0.025 in) in width. There are dark stripes on its thorax. Its chelicerae are brown with one tooth at the front, which has three points, and another, with two points, at the back. The part of its face known as its clypeus is brown,

The spider's abdomen is typically 1.44 mm (0.057 in) long, cream-colored and has dark spots on its back. Its legs are orange with brown segments. It has a pattern on its leg that is similar to that on Tartamura spiders. Its copulatory organs are distinctive. The spider's palpal tibia is elongated and has a triangular retrolateral tibial apophysis projecting from it. Its palpal bulb is flat and attached to its hairy cymbium. It has a simple embolus attached to the tegulum that points out from the side of the left palp and ends in a coil.

It is similar to the related Atomosphyrus breyeri, although that species lacks this species distinctive pattern on its legs. The spider can be distinguished from other members of the genus by the longer embolus and the shape of its retrolateral tibial apophysis.

== Distribution and habitat ==
The spider is endemic to Brazil. The holotype was found in Sete Cidades National Park in Brasileira, Piauí in 2007. The species distribution is limited to the National Park. The spider lives on the ground. It has been found in gallery forest and open fields, including both evergreen and deciduous shrubland.
