= Padilla wandae =

Scientific classification
- Kingdom: Animalia
- Phylum: Arthropoda
- Subphylum: Chelicerata
- Class: Arachnida
- Order: Araneae
- Infraorder: Araneomorphae
- Family: Salticidae
- Genus: Padilla
- Species: P. wandae

Binomial name
- Padilla wandae Azarkina & Haddad, 2021

Species of spider

Padilla wandae is a species of jumping spider in the genus Padilla that lives in Madagascar. The species was first described in 2020 by Galina Azarkina and Charles Haddad. It is a medium-sized spider, with a brown carapace that is between 1.55 and 1.75 mm (0.061 and 0.069 in) long, and a yellow abdomen that has a length of between 1.9 and 2.55 mm (0.075 and 0.100 in). The female is larger than the male. Although generally they have similar overall colouring and a single stripe on the carapace of both sexes, the female has one stripe on the abdomen and the male has two. The male palpal bulb has a hump in the middle and a coiled embolus. The female has an epigyne atrium that is longer than it is wide. The spider is similar to the related Padilla cornuta, but differs in lacking the chelicerae horns of the other species.

== Taxonomy ==
Padilla wandae was first described by Galina Azarkina and Charles Haddad in 2020. The species is named after the Polish arachnologist Wanda Wesołowska. It was allocated to the genus Padilla, which had been first described by George and Elizabeth Peckham in 1894. The genus is a member of the subfamily Ballinae, and one of 15 genera in the tribe Ballini. Wayne Maddison listed the tribe in the clade Marpissoida. In 2016, it had been grouped with 18 other genera of jumping spiders under the name Ballines by Jerzy Prószyński. The genus is likely to be endemic to Madagascar.

== Description ==
Padilla wandae is a medium-sized spider. The male has a typical total length of 3.45 mm (0.136 in). The brown carapace is covered with white scales and has a broad yellow stripe down the middle. It has a typical length of 1.55 mm (0.061 in) and width of 1 mm (0.039 in). The eye field is light brown with darker patches. The abdomen is 1.9 mm (0.075 in) long and 0.8 mm (0.031 in) wide. It is yellow with two brown stripes. There is no clypeus. The chelicerae are brown with three forward teeth and six behind. The spinnerets are also brown, as are the majority of the legs, apart from small yellow areas. The pedipalps are yellow-brown. The palpal bulb has a retrolateral tibial apophysis that has a piece that sticks out, a hump in the middle and an embolus that coils around into two rings.

The female is larger than the male, measuring 4.3 mm (0.17 in) in length. The carapace is also typically larger, measuring 1.75 mm (0.069 in) in length and 1.25 mm (0.049 in) in width. It is similar in colour to the male, but has yellow edging. The abdomen is different, having a single stripe, a length of 2.55 mm (0.100 in) and a width of 1 mm (0.039 in). The pedipalps are yellow, but otherwise the remainder of the colouring is similar to the male. The epigyne has a no pocket, an atrium that is longer than it is wide and winding copulatory ducts.

The species is similar in colours to the related Padilla cornuta but can be differentiated by the shorter protrusions on the chelicerae in comparison to the horns on the other species. Daniela Andriamalala noted that these horns are likely to have a role in sexual selection.

== Distribution and habitat ==
Padilla wandae is endemic to Madagascar. The holotype was found near Mahavelona in 1995. Other examples were found nearby. The spider seems to thrive in forest environments.
