= Ranops wandae =

Scientific classification
- Kingdom: Animalia
- Phylum: Arthropoda
- Subphylum: Chelicerata
- Class: Arachnida
- Order: Araneae
- Infraorder: Araneomorphae
- Family: Zodariidae
- Genus: Ranops
- Species: R. wandae

Binomial name
- Ranops wandae Jocqué & Henrard, 2020

Species of spider

Ranops wandae is a species of ant spider in the genus Ranops that lives in Namibia. First described in 2020 by Rudy Jocqué and Arnaud Henrard, the spider is small, measuring between 2.24 and 3.26 mm (0.088 and 0.128 in) in length. The male is smaller than the female. The carapace is brown, bottle-shaped and has a mottled pattern only on the male. The abdomen is grey, oval and also lacks any pattern on either sex. Most of the remainder of the spider is brown. The most characteristic feature of the genus are the long legs, which can measure up to 9.15 mm (0.360 in) long in the case of the back legs of the female. The legs are also yellow. The male also has a distinctive large curved median apophysis and curved retrolateral tibial apophysis on the palpal bulb which helps identify this species against others in the genus.

== Taxonomy ==
Ranops wandae was first described by Rudy Jocqué and Arnaud Henrard in 2020. The species is named after the Polish arachnologist Wanda Wesołowska and its description was first published in a festschrift produced in her honour. It was allocated to the genus Ranops, first described by Jocqué in 1991. The genus name is made of the Latin word rana, meaning frog, and the Greek word ops, meaning eye, and recalls the way that they look like frogs. The members of the genus resemble the species Acanthinozodium and Zodarion. The genus is a member of the family Zodariidae, raised by Tamerlan Thorell in 1881.

== Description ==
Ranops wandae is a small spider and has the characteristic long legs of the genus. The female has a total length of 3.26 mm (0.128 in) and a carapace with a typical length of 1.66 mm (0.065 in) and width of 1.15 mm (0.045 in). The carapace is slightly narrowed, almost bottle-like in shape, hairy and brown. It is darker at the front, and on the underside. There is no discernible pattern. The chelicerae, labium and sternum are also brown. The abdomen is grey, shaped like an oval and also lacks a pattern. The legs are yellow, long, slender and hairy. Although still long, the front legs are the shortest at 6.14 mm (0.242 in) long and the back legs are the longest at 9.15 mm (0.360 in) long. The pedipalps are also yellow. The epigyne has a narrow plate in the middle, two chambers leading to stout spermathecae situated one above the other, with the top one larger.

The male is slightly smaller, typically 2.24 mm (0.088 in). The carapace is similar in colour, but with a mottled patina and slightly smaller, typically 1.31 mm (0.052 in) long and 1.09 mm (0.043 in) across. The eye field is black. The chelicerae, labium sternum are a darker brown than the female. The pedipalps also contain more brown in their colouring. but the abdomen is a similar dark grey. The legs are still long, but shorter, by, for example, 3.26 mm (0.128 in) less in the case of the third pair. The palpal bulb has a flat cymbium, large curved median apophysis and curved retrolateral tibial apophysis that comes out of the side of the underside of the bulb.

Like others in the genus, the spider has distinctive long legs, which are multiple times the body length. Spiders in the genus also have, like some members of the Capheris and Systenoplacis genera, a wide sternum. Amongst the Ranops spiders, Ranops wandae can be identified by its copulatory organs, particularly the large median apophysis and the way that the retrolateral tibial apophysis is both shaped and extends from edge of the underside of the palpal bulb.

== Distribution and habitat ==
Ranops wandae is endemic to Namibia. The holotype was found near the Rössing uranium mine in 1994. The spider has been identified in many other areas of the country and is considered to have an extensive distribution. This is close to the centre of distribution for the genus, located in semiarid areas of southern Africa.
