= Eburneana scharffi =

Scientific classification
- Kingdom: Animalia
- Phylum: Arthropoda
- Subphylum: Chelicerata
- Class: Arachnida
- Order: Araneae
- Infraorder: Araneomorphae
- Family: Salticidae
- Genus: Eburneana
- Species: E. scharffi

Binomial name
- Eburneana scharffi Wesołowska & Szűts, 2001

Species of jumping spider

Eburneana scharffi is the type species for the genus Eburneana. Found in Tanzania, it is a species of jumping spider that mimics ants. It is a large spider, particularly the male, with a body length that is between 7.8 and 8.5 millimetres (0.31 and 0.33 in) long, and shares features to both species in its own genus and those in the family Pelleninae. Its jaws, or chelicerae, extend away from its face, with two teeth visible to the front and another behind, and are more robust than its relatives. It can be distinguished from the related Eburneana wandae by the way that the male's tibia on its front leg is swollen. The male also has a distinctive constriction between its head and thorax and the female has a distinctive pattern of patches on its abdomen formed by white hairs. The spider was first described in 2001.

== Taxonomy and etymology ==
Eburneana scharffi is a species of jumping spider, a member of the family Salticidae, that was first described by the arachnologists Wanda Wesołowska and Tamás Szűts in 2001. It is the type species of the genus Eburneana, one of many of spiders that mimic ants. The genus is named for Litus Eburneum, the Latin name for Ivory Coast, the place where one of the members of the genus, Eburneana magna was first found. The species is named in honour of Nikolaj Scharff, the curator of Arachnida at the Zoological Museum at the University in Copenhagen. It is one of over 500 species identified by Wesołowska. In 2015, the genus was added to the subclade Saltafresia in the clade Salticoida based on the analysis of 8 genes. In 2017, it was added to the supergroup Hylloida by Jerzy Prószyński based on a description of this species.

== Description ==
=== Male ===
A large ant-like spider, Eburneana scharffi has a flat and slender body that is divided into two main parts: a forward section, known as its cephalothorax, and, behind that, an oval abdomen. The male is larger, with a dark brown carapace, the hard upper part of the cephalothorax, that looks extended and measures between 4.4 and 4.6 millimetres (0.17 and 0.18 in) long, between 2.5 and 2.6 millimetres (0.098 and 0.102 in) wide and between 1.4 and 1.5 millimetres (0.055 and 0.059 in) high. It is covered with greyish hairs and has a thin line formed of white hairs runnings along its sides. There is a distinctive constriction between its head and thorax, the latter tapering off to be narrowest at the back of the carapace. The spider's eye field is short, extending over about one third of the total length of the carapace. The underside of its cephalothorax, or sternum, is narrow and light brown. The part of its face known as its clypeus is low, very long and covered in lighter hairs. This length means that its dark brown jaws, or chelicerae, are far from the front of its carapace. They are large, robust and show two small teeth at the front and a single bicuspid teeth to the rear.

The male's abdomen is elongated and measures between 3.7 and 3.9 millimetres (0.15 and 0.15 in) in length and between 1.8 and 2.0 millimetres (0.071 and 0.079 in) in width. It is generally wider towards the rear and has a slight constriction about a third of the way along. Its upper surface is almost completely covered with a shield-like dark brown hard shell, or scutum, and a carpet of thin brownish hairs. There are a scattering of white hairs on its edges. The underside of its abdomen is light brown. The spider has large book lung covers that show strong signs of sclerotization. It has long brownish orange spinnerets that it uses to spin webs. The rearmost spinnerets four fleshy bumps. Its legs are long and thin. Its first pair of legs are generally dark brown with tibia that are slightly swollen and covered in dense, long, scale-like, black hairs. Its rearmost legs are longer than the others and have few brown hairs. Like the other legs, they have a brown femur, whitish yellow patella, whitish tibia and brown and whitish metatarsus.

=== Female ===
The smaller female has a slightly smaller carapace that is typically 3.9 millimetres (0.15 in) long, 1.8 millimetres (0.071 in) wide and 1.2 millimetres (0.047 in) high and an abdomen that is typically 3.9 millimetres (0.15 in) long and 2.2 millimetres (0.087 in) wide. Its dark brown carapace is flat with a constriction behind its eye field, and a wider thorax that tapers to the rear in a similar fashion to the male. There are small indentations in its eye field. Its whole carapace is covered in brown and grey hairs with longer brown bristles visible on its clypeus and the area near its eyes. The spider's sternum is dark brown as are is chelicerae, which are more forward than other spiders in the family with two teeth visible to the front and another behind. Its brown labium and maxillae have pale tips.

The female's abdomen is dark russet on top with a covering of delicate brownish hairs. There are light patches visible towards the middle of its upper surfaces and, towards the rear, another set of patches that blend into the background. The underside of its abdomen is dark brown. Its spinnerets are yellowish grey, the rearmost pair having four distinct fleshy bumps similar to the male. It has whitish trochanters. Its first pair of legs are generally yellowish apart from their femurs, which are mainly brown. The second pair of legs have lighter metatarsi and tarsi. The remaining legs are mainly yellowish with some darker rings visible on some segments.

=== Comparison to other species ===
The spider has distinctive copulatory organs. The male has long slender pedipalps that end in a short palpal tibia that has a single short straight spike, or tibial apophysis. Attached to the tibia is a At long narrow cymbium and a small round palpal bulb. The female's oval epigyne, the external visible part of its copulatory organs, has sclerotised "wings" visible near its gonopores, which sit within narrow slits. Behind them can be found a single pocket and two copulatory openings that lead, via long and coiled insemination ducts, to large spermathecae, or receptacles.

The spider is distinguished from other members of genus by the four nipple-like shapes on its spinnerets. The male has a particularly long and slender embolus, while the pattern on the abdomen of the female makes it easy to tell apart. Compared to the male Eburneana wandae specifically, the spider can be identified by the swollen tibia in the front leg and more robust chelicerae. It shares some similarities with other ant-mimicking jumping spiders, particularly the males that have front legs that are similar to members of the family Pelleninae.

== Distribution ==
Eburneana scharffi is the only member of the genus that is endemic to Tanzania. The holotype was found in the Usambara Mountains but the species has been found at a number of other locations around the country, including the Kazimzubwe Forest Reserve in the Kisarawe District and the Namakut wa-Nyamuete Forest Reserve in the Rufiji District. A juvenile member of the species was found in the Mkomazi National Park in 2000, only later recognised as an example of the species.

=== Bibliography ===
- Maddison, Wayne P.; Li, Daiqin; Bodner, Melissa; Zhang, Junxia; Xu, Xin; Liu, Qingqing; Liu, Fengxiang (2014). "The deep phylogeny of jumping spiders (Araneae, Salticidae)". ZooKeys (440): 57–87. doi:10.3897/zookeys.440.7891. PMC 4195940. PMID 25317062.
- Prószyński, Jerzy (2017). "Pragmatic classification of the world's Salticidae (Araneae)". Ecologica Montenegrina. 12: 1–133. doi:10.37828/em.2017.12.1.
- Russell-Smith, Anthony (2020). "A Checklist of the Spiders of Tanzania". Journal of East African Natural History. 109 (1): 1–41. doi:10.2982/028.109.0101. S2CID 220526607.
- Szûts, Tamás (2003). "A new species of Eburneana Wesołowska & Szûts with notes on the biogeography and morphology of the genus (Araneae: Salticidae)". Genus. 14 (3): 419–424.
- Wesołowska, Wanda; Szűts, Tamás (2001). "A New Genus of Ant-Like Jumping Spiders from Africa (Araneae: Salticidae)". Annales Zoologici. 51 (4): 523–528.
- Wiśniewski, Konrad (2020). "Over 40 years with jumping spiders: on the 70th birthday of Wanda Wesołowska". Zootaxa. 4899 (1): 5–14. doi:10.11646/zootaxa.4899.1.3. PMID 33756825. S2CID 232337200.
