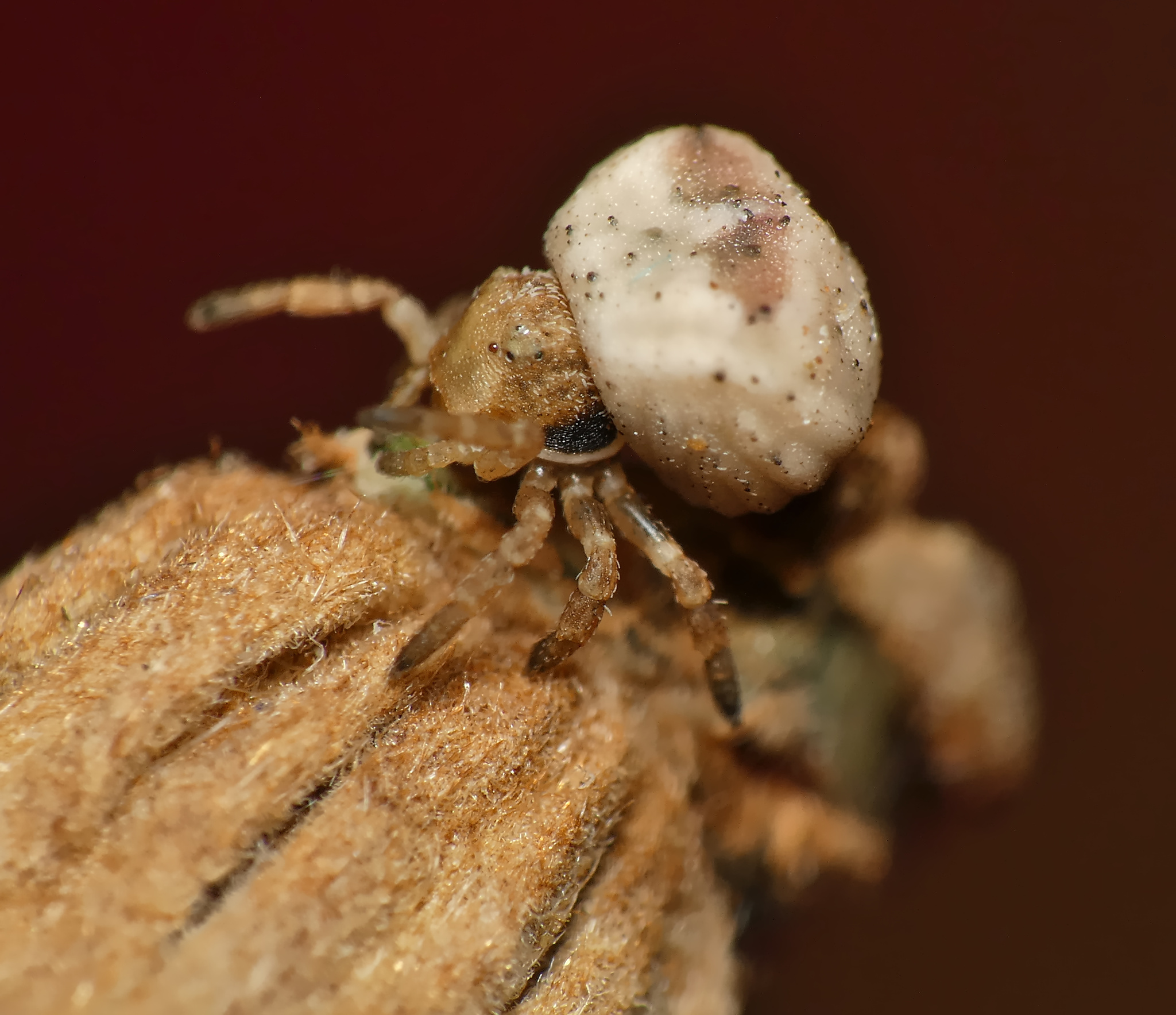
- P. megae
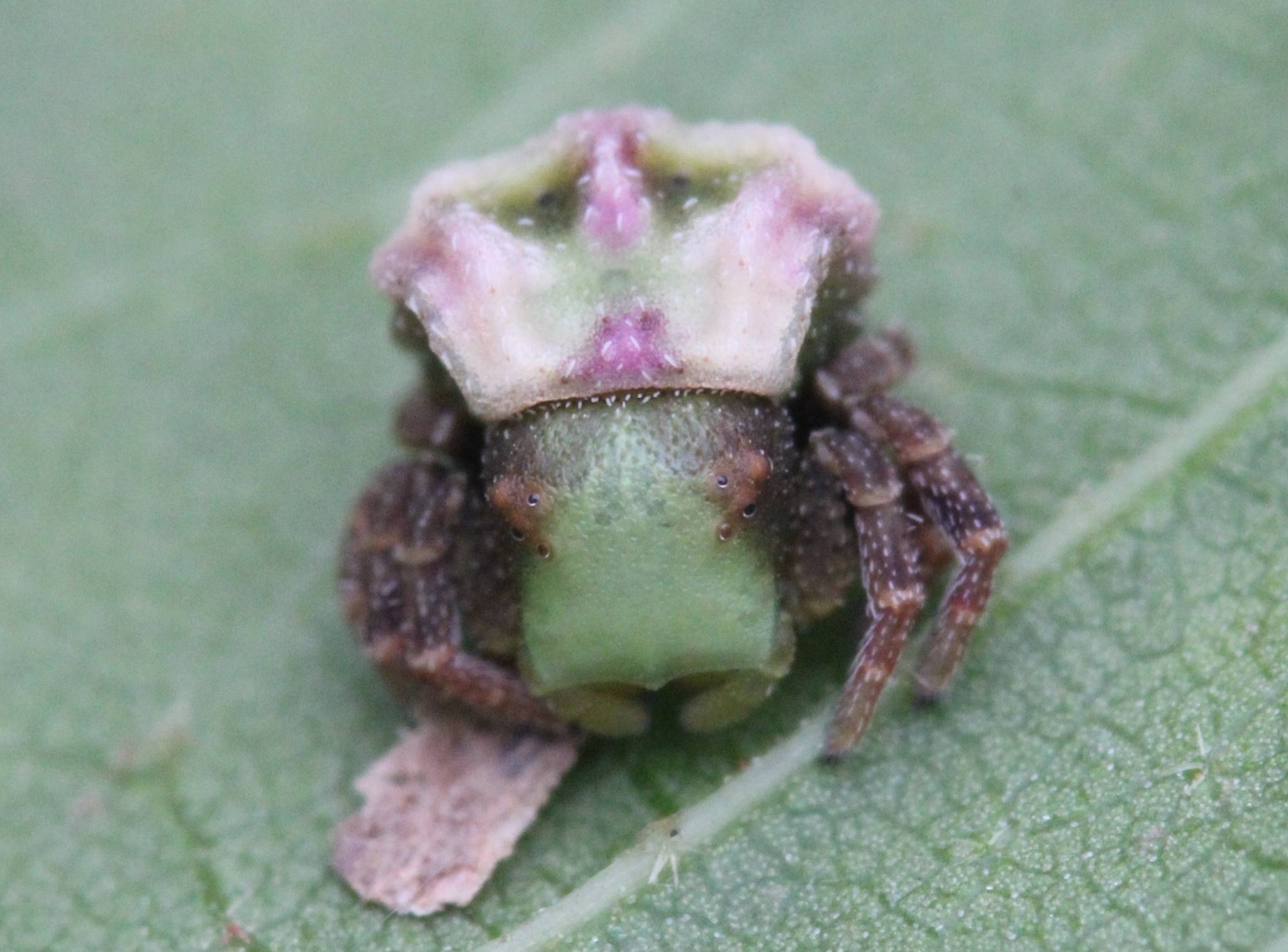
- P. megae

Scientific classification
- Kingdom: Animalia
- Phylum: Arthropoda
- Subphylum: Chelicerata
- Class: Arachnida
- Order: Araneae
- Infraorder: Araneomorphae
- Family: Thomisidae
- Genus: Parabomis; Kulczyński, 1901

Type species
- Parabomis levanderi Kulczyński, 1901

Species
- 6, see text

= Parabomis =

Genus of spiders

Parabomis is a genus of African spiders in the family Thomisidae. It was first described in 1901 by Władysław Kulczyński.

== Description ==
Parabomis spiders are characterized by their small size, short legs, globular bodies, and thick granulose integument. The female carapace is very high with a strong posterior declivity. The eye pattern is distinct with both anterior and posterior median and lateral eyes closely grouped. The carapace is fawn with the clypeus and eye region strongly infused with white. The lateral side is dark yellow to fawn with dark brown patches.

The abdomen is fawn to brown infused with white, globular, and with strong striae. The legs are reddish-brown with darker coxae and femora. Males are smaller than females and darker in color. The male carapace is dark brown with darker patches laterally. The chelicerae, mouthparts, and sternum are dark to yellowish brown.

The male legs are reddish-brown with coxae and femora darker, and the articulation area of each segment has a white rim. The abdominal dorsum is white with a brown hue, shield-like, and bears two longitudinal series of black spots dorsally in depressions.

== Life style ==
Parabomis are free-living plant dwellers. Most specimens have been sampled from trees.

== Species ==
As of October 2025, this genus includes six species:

- Parabomis elsae Dippenaar-Schoeman & Foord, 2020 – South Africa
- Parabomis levanderi Kulczyński, 1901 – Eritrea (type species)
- Parabomis martini Lessert, 1919 – Guinea, Kenya, Rwanda, Tanzania, Zambia, Malawi, Namibia, Zimbabwe, South Africa
- Parabomis megae Dippenaar-Schoeman & Foord, 2020 – Zimbabwe
- Parabomis pilosa Dippenaar-Schoeman & Foord, 2020 – Botswana, South Africa
- Parabomis wandae Dippenaar-Schoeman & Foord, 2020 – Ivory Coast, Ghana, Rwanda, Kenya
