= Systenoplacis fagei =

Hluhluwe Systenoplacis zodariid spider

Conservation status
- Least Concern (SANBI Red List)

Scientific classification
- Kingdom: Animalia
- Phylum: Arthropoda
- Subphylum: Chelicerata
- Class: Arachnida
- Order: Araneae
- Infraorder: Araneomorphae
- Family: Zodariidae
- Genus: Systenoplacis
- Species: S. fagei

Binomial name
- Systenoplacis fagei (Lawrence, 1937)

Synonyms
- Cydrelichus fagei Lawrence, 1937

Species of spider

Systenoplacis fagei is a species of spider in the family Zodariidae. It is endemic to South Africa and is commonly known as the Hluhluwe Systenoplacis zodariid spider. It is named for the French zoologist Louis Fage, and so should be pronounced /ˈfɑːʒiː/.

== Distribution ==
Systenoplacis fagei has a wide distribution across three provinces of South Africa: KwaZulu-Natal, Limpopo, and the Western Cape.

== Habitat ==
The species inhabits multiple biomes including Fynbos, Forest, Indian Ocean Coastal Belt, and Savanna at altitudes ranging from 4 to 1,341 m above sea level.

== Description ==
Both sexes of Systenoplacis fagei are known. Females reach 8.56 mm in total length with a medium reddish brown carapace and reddish brown chelicerae. The abdomen is grey sparsely mottled with white, featuring four small oval spots in front of the spinnerets. Males are smaller at 7.08 mm total length with a uniform chestnut brown carapace and a distinctive white spot on the abdomen shaped like four coalescing chevrons.

== Ecology ==
Systenoplacis fagei are free-running ground spiders that inhabit diverse environments from coastal areas to inland savannas and forests.

== Conservation ==
The species is listed as Least Concern by the South African National Biodiversity Institute due to its wide geographical range. It is protected in seven protected areas including Hluhluwe Nature Reserve, Ndumo Game Reserve, Tembe Elephant Park, Kruger National Park, and others.
