= Peckhamia picata =

Scientific classification
- Kingdom: Animalia
- Phylum: Arthropoda
- Subphylum: Chelicerata
- Class: Arachnida
- Order: Araneae
- Infraorder: Araneomorphae
- Family: Salticidae
- Genus: Peckhamia
- Species: P. picata

Binomial name
- Peckhamia picata (Hentz, 1846)

Species of spider

Peckhamia picata, the antmimic jumper, is a species of jumping spider in the family Salticidae. It is found in North America. It specifically mimics the species Camponotus nearcticus, and does not elicit aggressive behavior from said ants.

(Post on Bugguide featuring a Peckhamia Picata specimen)
