= Padilla javana =

Scientific classification
- Kingdom: Animalia
- Phylum: Arthropoda
- Subphylum: Chelicerata
- Class: Arachnida
- Order: Araneae
- Infraorder: Araneomorphae
- Family: Salticidae
- Genus: Padilla
- Species: P. javana

Binomial name
- Padilla javana Simon, 1900

Species of spider

Padilla javana is the only species of jumping spider in the genus Padilla that occurs on Java, with most others found in Madagascar, and one in China.

== Description ==
The cephalothorax is flat and long, with the thorax much longer than the head part. It is of a leathery dark brown, with the cephalus and the sides black. On the thorax there is a broad median yellow stripe, edged with yellow hairs. The abdomen is smooth and black with a vague median stripe. The front legs are very robust and dark, with yellowish tips. All other legs are pale yellow. The male lacks the characteristic process of the chelicera found in most other males of the genus Padilla.
