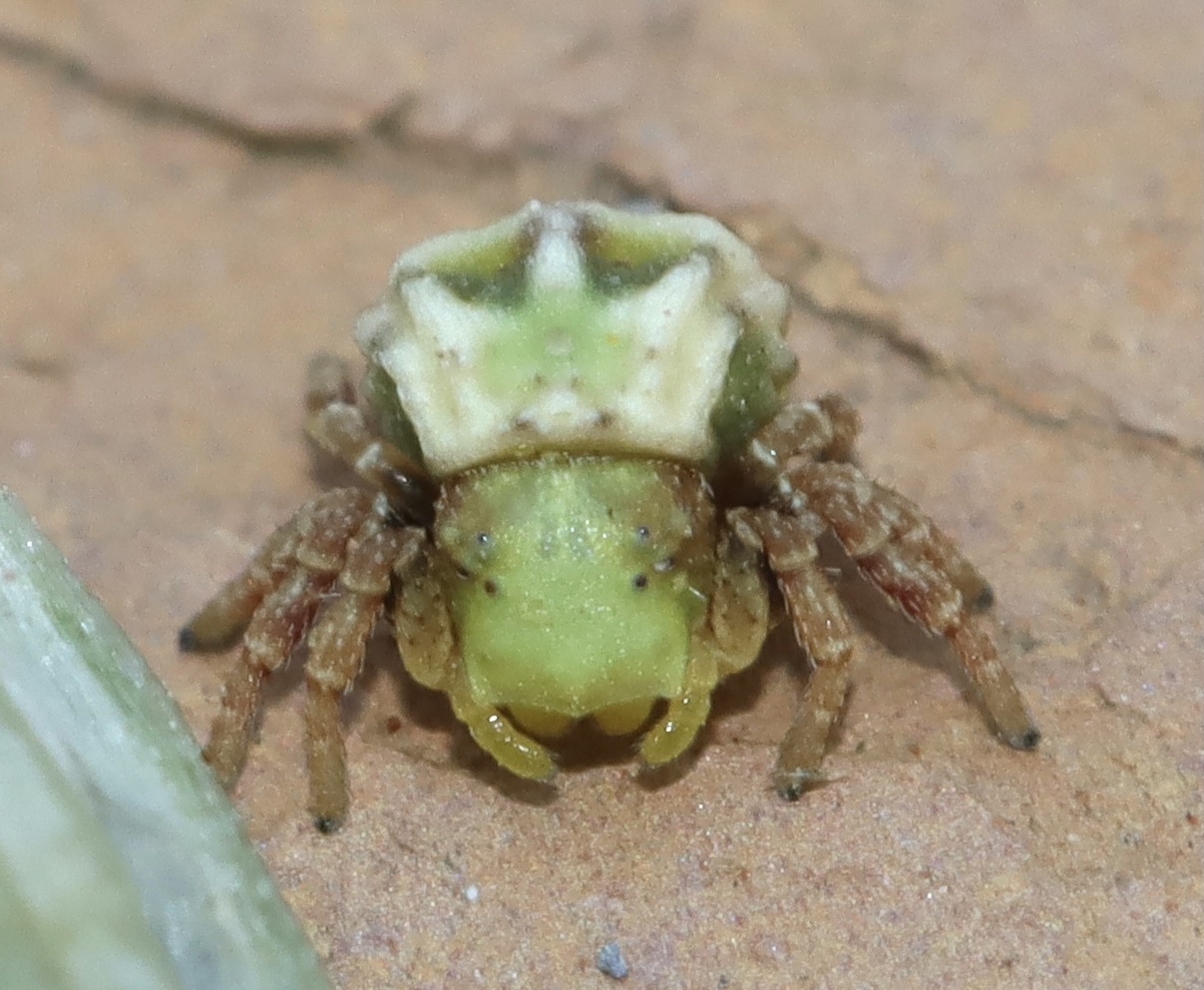

Scientific classification
- Kingdom: Animalia
- Phylum: Arthropoda
- Subphylum: Chelicerata
- Class: Arachnida
- Order: Araneae
- Infraorder: Araneomorphae
- Family: Thomisidae
- Genus: Parabomis
- Species: P. martini

Binomial name
- Parabomis martini Lessert, 1919

Synonyms
- Parabomis anabensis Lawrence, 1928

= Parabomis martini =

Martin's Bomid Crab Spider

Species of spider

Parabomis martini is a spider in the family Thomisidae. It is found in several African countries and is commonly known as Martin's Bomid crab spider.

== Distribution ==
Parabomis martini is found in Guinea, Kenya, Rwanda, Tanzania, Zambia, Malawi, Namibia, Zimbabwe, and South Africa.

In South Africa, it is known from Eastern Cape, Free State, Gauteng, KwaZulu-Natal, Limpopo, and North West provinces.

== Habitat and ecology ==
Parabomis martini has been collected from a variety of habitats ranging from grass and trees in thorn bushveld to the undergrowth of coastal dune forest.

They have also been collected from the tree species Buddleia saligna, Euclea crispa, Dombeya sp., Vitex rehmanni, and Pterocelastrus tricuspidatus.

The species has been recorded from Grassland, Savanna, and Thicket biomes at altitudes ranging from 10 to 1860 m.

== Conservation ==
Parabomis martini is listed as Least Concern by the South African National Biodiversity Institute due to its wide geographical range. The species is recorded in 11 reserves. There are no significant threats and no conservation actions are recommended.

== Taxonomy ==
Parabomis martini was described by Roger de Lessert in 1919 from Tanzania. Dippenaar-Schoeman and Foord synonymized Parabomis anabensis Lawrence, 1928 with P. martini in 2020. The species is known from both sexes.
