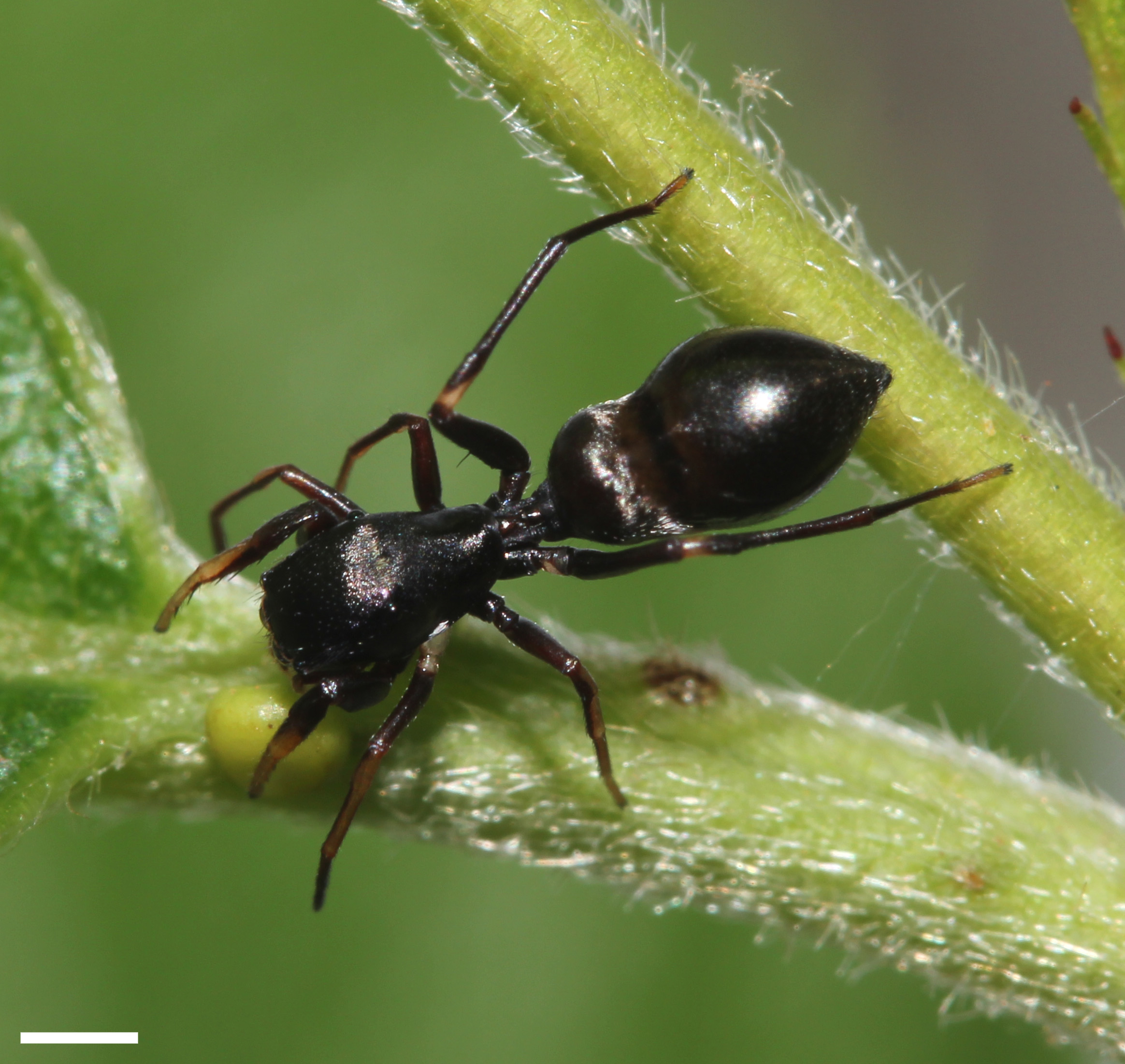
- Female Peckhamia sp.

Scientific classification
- Kingdom: Animalia
- Phylum: Arthropoda
- Subphylum: Chelicerata
- Class: Arachnida
- Order: Araneae
- Infraorder: Araneomorphae
- Family: Salticidae
- Subfamily: Salticinae
- Genus: Peckhamia; Simon, 1900

Type species
- P. scorpionia (Hentz, 1846)

Species
- 9, see text

Synonyms
- Consingis Simon, 1900

= Peckhamia (spider) =

Genus of spiders

Peckhamia is a genus of ant-mimicking jumping spiders that was first described by Eugène Louis Simon in 1900. It is named in honor of George and Elizabeth Peckham, and is considered a senior synonym of the genus Consingis.

== Species ==
As of October 2025 it contains sixteen species, found in North America, Central America, Suriname, Argentina, Brazil, and the Greater Antilles:

- Peckhamia americana (Peckham & Peckham, 1892) – USA, Mexico, Hispaniola
- Peckhamia areito Cala-Riquelme, Bustamante, Crews & Cutler, 2020 – Dominican Republic
- Peckhamia argentinensis Galiano, 1986 – Argentina
- Peckhamia espositoae Cala-Riquelme, Bustamante, Crews & Cutler, 2020 – Jamaica
- Peckhamia formosa (Bryant, 1943) – Haiti
- Peckhamia magna (Bryant, 1943) – Dominican Republic
- Peckhamia montana (Bryant, 1943) – Dominican Republic
- Peckhamia picata (Hentz, 1846) – North America
- Peckhamia prescotti Chickering, 1946 – Mexico, El Salvador, Panama
- Peckhamia scorpionia (Hentz, 1846) (type) – USA, Canada
- Peckhamia semicana (Simon, 1900) – Brazil, Argentina
- Peckhamia seminola Gertsch, 1936 – USA (Florida)
- Peckhamia soesilae Makhan, 2006 – Suriname
- Peckhamia surcaribensis Cala-Riquelme, Bustamante, Crews & Cutler, 2020 – Cuba
- Peckhamia variegata (F. O. Pickard-Cambridge, 1900) – Panama
- Peckhamia wesolowskae Cala-Riquelme, Bustamante, Crews & Cutler, 2020 – Cuba
