= Parabomis wandae =

Scientific classification
- Kingdom: Animalia
- Phylum: Arthropoda
- Subphylum: Chelicerata
- Class: Arachnida
- Order: Araneae
- Infraorder: Araneomorphae
- Family: Thomisidae
- Genus: Parabomis
- Species: P. wandae

Binomial name
- Parabomis wandae Dippenaar-Schoeman & Foord, 2020

Species of jumping spider

Parabomis wandae is a species of crab spider that lives in Ghana, Ivory Coast, Kenya and Rwanda. A member of the genus Parabomis, the species was first described in 2020 by Ansie Dippenaar-Schoeman and Stefan Foord. It thrives in rainforests. The spider is very small, with a total length between 1.9 and 2.26 mm (0.075 and 0.089 in), the female being larger and lighter in colour than the male. It has a distinctive hump to the abdomen, which for the female is less pronounced. The female abdomen has dark patches and spots on its white surface, while the male has a brown shell. The species can be differentiated from other members of the genus by its copulatory organs. The male has a distinctive beak-like end of the retrolateral tibial apophysis. The female has an egg-shaped epigyne with long copulatory ducts.

== Taxonomy ==
Parabomis wandae is a species of crab spider, a member of the family Thomisidae, that was first described by the South African arachnologists Ansie Dippenaar-Schoeman and Stefan Foord in 2020. The species is named after the Polish arachnologist Wanda Wesołowska. They allocated it to the genus Parabomis, which had been first circumscribed by Władysław Kulczyński in 1901. The genus is a member of the family Thomisidae, known as crab spiders, Like other members of the subfamily Bominae, the spiders are small with short legs and a globular body. They are related to the genera Holopelus and Thomisops. The species is particularly noted for its size, being amongst the smallest of the family, and is also known as a frog spider.

== Description ==
The spider is very small. The male has a typical total length of 1.9 mm (0.075 in). Its carapace, the hard upper part of its front section, is dark brown, measuring 0.91 mm (0.036 in) long and 0.95 mm (0.037 in) wide, and has many small nodules. Its eye field is black. The part of the underside of its carapace known as the sternum brown and covered in granules. Its jaws or chelicerae are brown while its remaining mouthparts, including its labium and maxillae, are yellowish-brown.

The abdomen has a distinctive hump shape. It is covered in a hard brown shell with black patches on top and has a paler underside. Its legs are generally dark brown with white bands on its joints. Its copulatory organs are distinctive. Its pedipalp ends in a tibia that features tufts of hairs and has a long retrolateral tibial apophysis that is characteristic of the species. It is broad, almost as wide as the rest of the spider's palpal bulb and its end is beak-like. At the top of its tibia is a hairy round cymbium and palpal bulb. The spider can be distinguished from others in the genus by its retrolateral tibial apophysis and the hump on its abdomen.

The female is larger than the male, typically reaching 2.26 mm (0.089 in) in length. Its carapace is a lighter brown and measures 0.97 mm (0.038 in) in length and 1.1 mm (0.043 in) in width. There are white areas in its eye field although its chelicerae are also a fawn colour. Its abdomen has a less distinctive hump and is lighter in colour, white with dark patches and spots. The epigyne, the external visible part of the female's copulatory organs, is shaped like an egg and has thick edges. Its copulatory ducts are long and curved, leading to elongated spermathecae. The shape of its epigyne particular helps identify the species.

== Behaviour ==
Parabomis wandae is active between September and November, although its life cycle outside that time has not been observed. Spiders of the genus have a short strike range and will only feed on prey that is in close range. Its short legs also impede web spinning and so the spider will use gravity to help.

== Distribution and habitat ==
Parabomis wandae has been found in Ghana, Ivory Coast, Kenya and Rwanda. The holotype was found in Kakum National Park in Ghana in 2005. It was also identified in forests near Appouasso in Ivory Coast, in Kakamega Forest in Kenya and near to Ibanda Makera in Rwanda. The spider thrives in a range of rain forest habitats, including both primary and secondary forests, and montane ecosystems.
