= Phintella parva =

Scientific classification
- Kingdom: Animalia
- Phylum: Arthropoda
- Subphylum: Chelicerata
- Class: Arachnida
- Order: Araneae
- Infraorder: Araneomorphae
- Family: Salticidae
- Genus: Phintella
- Species: P. parva

Binomial name
- Phintella parva (Wesołowska, 1981)

Species of spider

Phintella parva is a species of jumping spider in the genus Phintella that lives in China, Japan, Korea and Russia. The spider is yellow in colour and small, measuring between 3.5 and 4 mm (0.14 and 0.16 in) in body length. It exhibits sexual dimorphism, with the female being slightly larger than the male. The abdomen has a striped pattern and the carapace has circular markings, but the most significant difference to other members of the genus are its copulatory organs, particularly the short curved embolus in the male and the long straight insemination ducts in the female. The species was first described by Wanda Wesołowska in 1981 based on a specimen collected in North Korea. The spider was originally classified within the genus Icius under the name Icius parvus, but was transferred to its current genus by Jerzy Prószyński in 1983. It was also recognised that other examples of the spider had been previously collected, including, at one time, a description of one found in the Soviet Union published in 1979 without a species name.

== Taxonomy and etymology ==
In 1981, the Polish arachnologist Wanda Wesołowska described a new species of jumping spider, a member of the family Salticidae, which she named Icius parvus. It was one of over 500 species that she identified in her career. Originally ascribed to the genus Icius, first circumscribed by Eugène Simon in 1876, the species was later transferred to Phintella in 1983 by Jerzy Prószyński. At the same time, the gender of the species name was changed, from parvus to parva.

The genus Phintella was first circumscribed in 1906 by Embrik Strand and W. Bösenberg. There are similarities between Phintella and the genera Chira, Chrysilla, Euophrys, Icius, Jotus and Telamonia. Genetic analysis confirms that Phintella is related to the genera Helvetia and Menemerus. In 2015, Wayne Maddison classified it in the tribe Chrysillini, named after the genus Chrysilla. In 2017, Prószyński grouped the genus with 32 other genera of jumping spiders under the name Chrysillines in the supergroup Chrysilloida.

Phintella parva is known under the common name Myohyangkkangchunggeomi (Korean: 묘향깡충거미) in Korea. The spider's specific name is Latin for "small". Its generic name derives from the genus Phintia due to the similarities between the two genera. Phintia was itself renamed Phintodes and was subsequently absorbed into the genus Tylogonus.

== Description ==
Phintella parva is a small spider with some sexual dimorphism. The female is larger than the male, with a total length of between 4 and 5 mm (0.16 and 0.20 in). The body is divided into two main parts: a cephalothorax and an abdomen. The cephalothorax is between 1.78 and 2.05 mm (0.070 and 0.081 in) in length and between 1.28 and 1.55 mm (0.050 and 0.061 in) in width. The carapace, the hard upper shell of the cephalothorax, is longer than wide and quadrangle-shaped. It is yellow with circular markings to towards the back. The spider's eye field is black. The underside of the carapace, or sternum, has brown sides and a yellow middle. The mouthparts are distinctive. They are generally yellow but the chelicerae have brown lines on the front and the labium has a brown lower part.

The abdomen measures between 2.98 and 3.08 mm (0.117 and 0.121 in) in length and 1.8 and 2.18 mm (0.071 and 0.086 in) in width. It is also yellow and has two broad stripes running along the sides. Some spiders have an additional stripe running down the middle of the abdomen. Four or five chevrons can often be seen at the very back. There is another black stripe on the underside that runs from the epigastric furrow at the back to the spiracle. The spinnerets are yellow, as are the legs. It has unusual copulatory organs. The epigyne, the external female copulatory organ, is small with little sclerotization. It has a pocket towards the very rear, near the epigastric furrow. The copulatory openings lead to spherical spermathecae, or receptacles, via relatively long straight insemination ducts.

The male is similar to the female. It is slightly smaller with a total length of between 3.78 and 4.67 mm (0.149 and 0.184 in). The cephalothorax is between 1.73 and 1.9 mm (0.068 and 0.075 in) long and between 1.25 and 1.38 mm (0.049 and 0.054 in) wide. The carapace has similar colouring, but is less pale. The mouthparts are similar to those of the female. The abdomen is between 1.83 and 2 mm (0.072 and 0.079 in) long and 1.05 and 1.2 mm (0.041 and 0.047 in) wide. The legs are similarly yellow, although there are brown patches on their femora. The palpal bulb is slightly smaller than in other members of the genus, with a shape reminiscent of a bean. It has a short curved embolus emanating from the palpal bulb and a single straight tibial apophysis, a projection on the pedipalp tibia.

== Similar species ==
Phintella parva is often confused with other species of the genus. In particular, it closely resembles the related Phintella popovi, differing only in the shape of the copulatory organs. The male's curved embolus and straight tibial apophysis are characteristic and the length of the insemination ducts in the female allows for species identification. Cluster analysis confirms that the species is most closely related to Phintella cavaleriei, followed by Phintella bifurcilinea; both share similar species distributions.

At the same time as she described Icius parvus, Wesołowska also described two other specimens that she identified as either Icius linea or Icius abnomis. She recognised that the samples were similar to those species but that the exact relationship between the different specimens uncertain. In 2000, Dmitri Logunov and Yu Marusik identified that these two examples were actually of Phintella parva. The first example in Japan was originally thought to be Phintella mellotei, while a male specimen had been mislabelled Phintella difficilis by Logunov in 1979. This was rectified in 1992 by Logunov and Wesołowska; all these specimens are now recognised as examples of the species Phintella parva.

== Distribution and habitat ==
Phintella parva lives in China, Japan, Korea and Russia. The holotype of the species, a female, was discovered in the valleys around Mount Myohyang, North Korea, by Bohdan Pisarski and Prószyński in 1959. Other female specimens were also seen near the city of Pyongyang and in South Hamgyong Province. They were not described and named until 1981. Subsequently, examples have been found throughout the country. The spider was recorded in Haeju in 1987, followed by Chongjin, Hongwon County, Kaesong and Kyongsong County in 1990. The spider was also found around Mount Kumgang at the same time. South Korea was later added to the species distribution, with examples being identified in Sobaeksan and area around Palgongsan in the North Gyeongsang Province, the first to be found dating from 1964.

The spider has also been observed outside the Korean peninsula. Wesołowska noted that it had been found in Primorsky Krai, in what was then the Russian Soviet Federative Socialist Republic of the Soviet Union, and described in 1979, but had not been given a species name. Later, specimens from Furugelm Island were also referred to the species. The first example in China was identified in Shanxi. The species was subsequently found in many other areas of the country, including Beijing, Gansu, Hebei and Henan. Hebei is a particularly rich area for the species. Finds include 19 examples collected from Zhuolu County and Yu County in 2004 and 2006 respectively. The spider has also been observed in the Mie Prefecture of Honshu, Japan, which extends its range even further.

The spider seems to thrive in diverse environments, including the environs of Tianchi Mountain, Song County, Luoyang, the city of Linzhou, rural areas in Neixiang County and the pine woods of Khabarovsk Krai.
