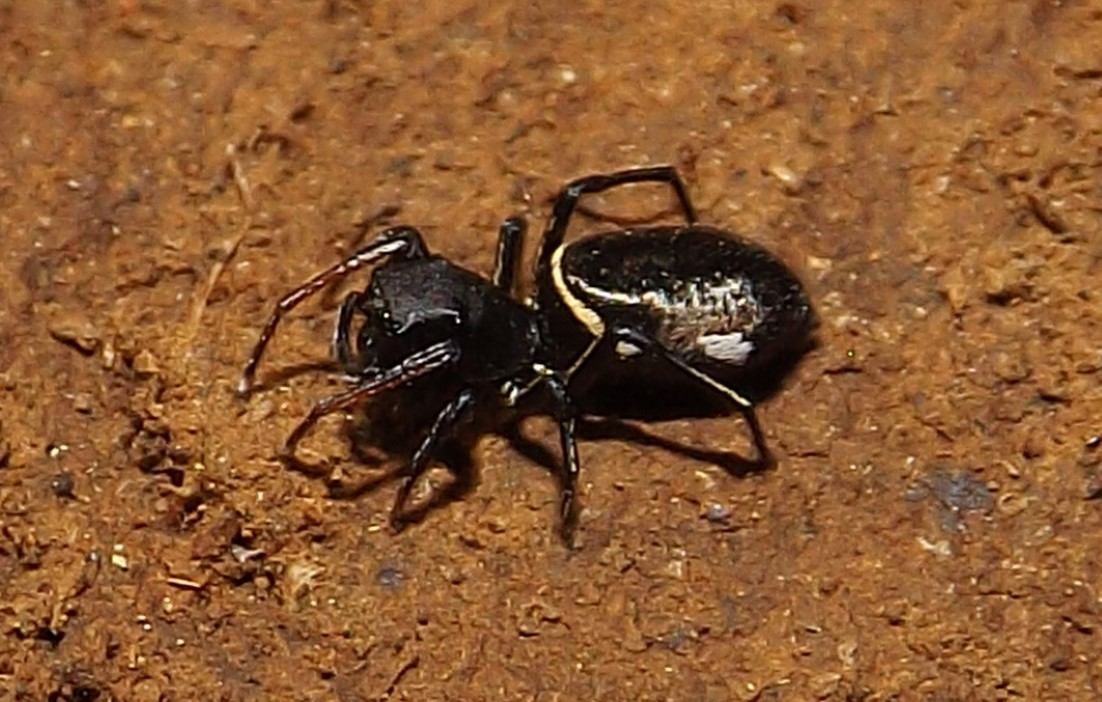
- Atomosphyrus tristiculus

Scientific classification
- Kingdom: Animalia
- Phylum: Arthropoda
- Subphylum: Chelicerata
- Class: Arachnida
- Order: Araneae
- Infraorder: Araneomorphae
- Family: Salticidae
- Subfamily: Salticinae
- Genus: Atomosphyrus; Simon, 1902

Type species
- A. tristiculus Simon, 1902

Species
- A. breyeri Galiano, 1966 – Argentina; A. tristiculus Simon, 1902 – Chile; A. wandae Bustamante & Ruiz, 2020 – Brazil

= Atomosphyrus =

Genus of spiders

Atomosphyrus is a genus of South American jumping spiders that was first described by Eugène Louis Simon in 1902. As of April 2022 it contains three species, found in Chile, Argentina and Brazil: A. breyeri, A. tristiculus and A. wandae.
