= Eburneana magna =

Scientific classification
- Kingdom: Animalia
- Phylum: Arthropoda
- Subphylum: Chelicerata
- Class: Arachnida
- Order: Araneae
- Infraorder: Araneomorphae
- Family: Salticidae
- Genus: Eburneana
- Species: E. magna

Binomial name
- Eburneana magna Wesołowska & Szűts, 2001

Species of spider

Eburneana magna is a species of jumping spider in the genus Eburneana that mimics ants. It is a large spider, as is emphasised by the species name, the Latin for big, with a body that can be up to 12 millimetres (0.47 in) in length, although only the female has been identified and in other species in the genus the male is larger than the female. The species has been identified from a holotype found in Ivory Coast.

== Taxonomy and etymology ==
Eburneana magna is a species of jumping spider that was first named by Wanda Wesołowska and Tamás Szűts in 2001. It is one of over 500 species identified by Wesołowska. It is the type species of the genus Eburneana, one of many of spiders that mimics ants. The genus is named for Litus Eburneum, the Latin name for Ivory Coast, where the species was first identified. The species name is the Latin word for big, in reference to the relatively large size of the spider. In 2015, the genus was added to the subclade Saltafresia in the clade Salticoida based on the analysis of 8 genes. In 2017, it was added to the supergroup Hylloida by Jerzy Prószyński.

== Description ==
Eburneana magna is a large spider, with a very flat body measuring up to 12 millimetres (0.47 in) in length. Only the female has been described. The holotype has a dark brown, almost black, carapace that looks extended and is 5.4 millimetres (0.21 in) long and 2.5 millimetres (0.098 in) wide. It is covered with short grey hairs. The abdomen is also elongated and measures 5.1 millimetres (0.20 in) long and 3.3 millimetres (0.13 in) wide. While all examples are relatively large, the male of the genus is generally even larger than the female. For example, the male of the related species Eburneana scharffi has a carapace that is between 0.7 and 0.9 millimetres (0.028 and 0.035 in) longer than the female.

The spider is distinguished from other members of genus by a large number of spigots on its spinneret and the structure of epigyne. It shares some similarities with other ant-mimicking jumping spiders, particularly the males that have front legs that are similar to members of the family Pelleninae.

== Distribution ==
Eburneana magna is the only member of the genus that is endemic to the Ivory Coast. The only example identified to date was a single female specimen found on Mont Tonkoui in Tonkpi.
