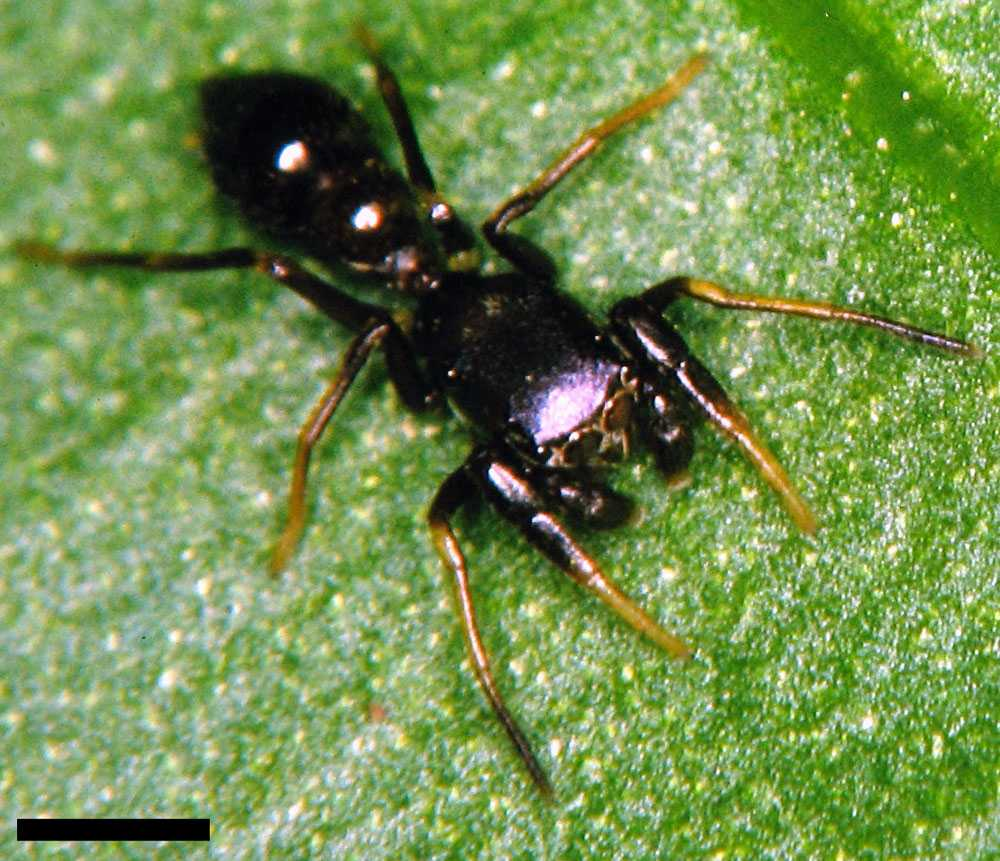

Scientific classification
- Kingdom: Animalia
- Phylum: Arthropoda
- Subphylum: Chelicerata
- Class: Arachnida
- Order: Araneae
- Infraorder: Araneomorphae
- Family: Salticidae
- Genus: Peckhamia
- Species: P. americana

Binomial name
- Peckhamia americana (Peckham & Peckham, 1892)

= Peckhamia americana =

Species of spider

Peckhamia americana is a species of jumping spider. It is found in the United States, Mexico, and Hispaniola.
