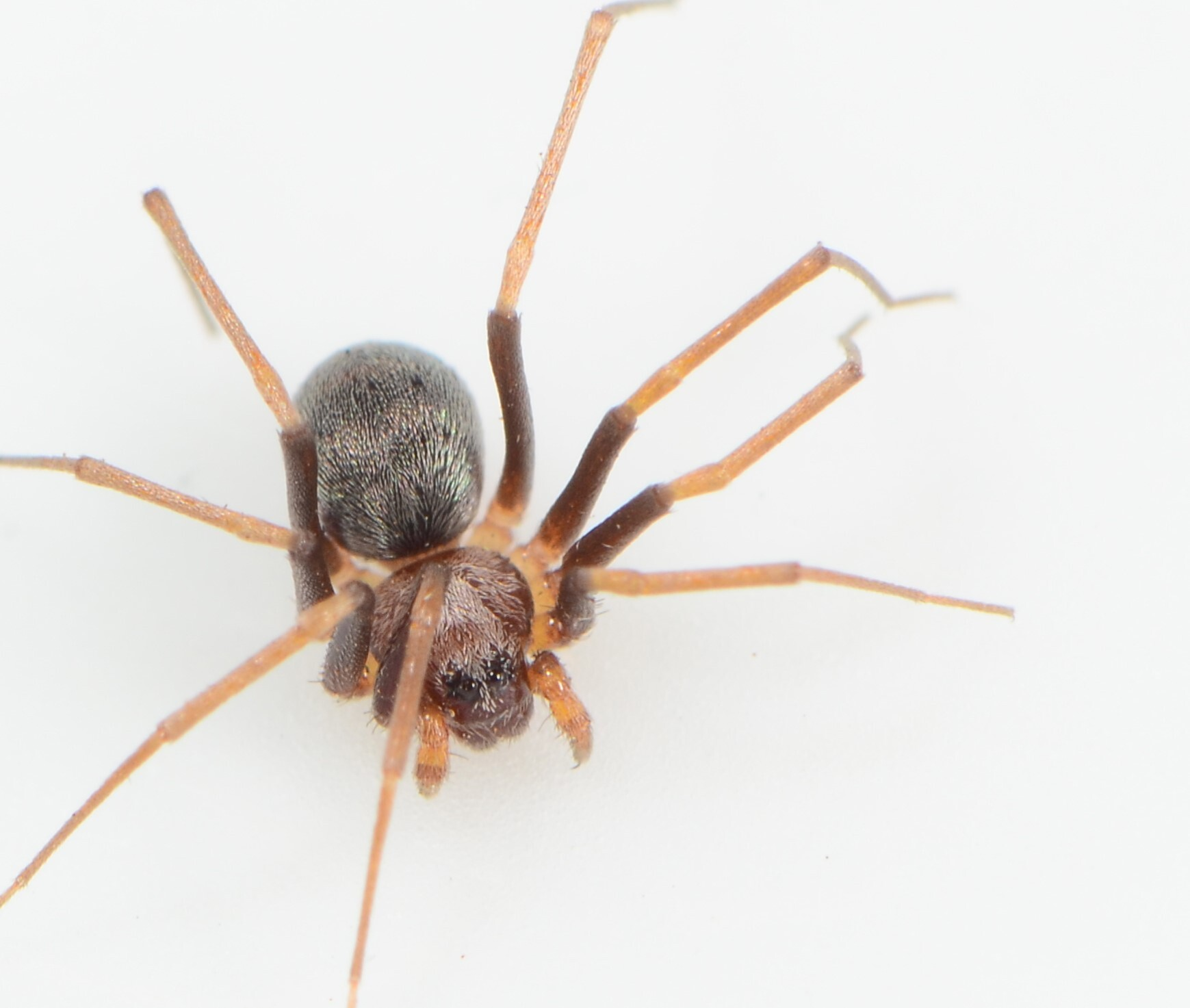
- Female R. robinae
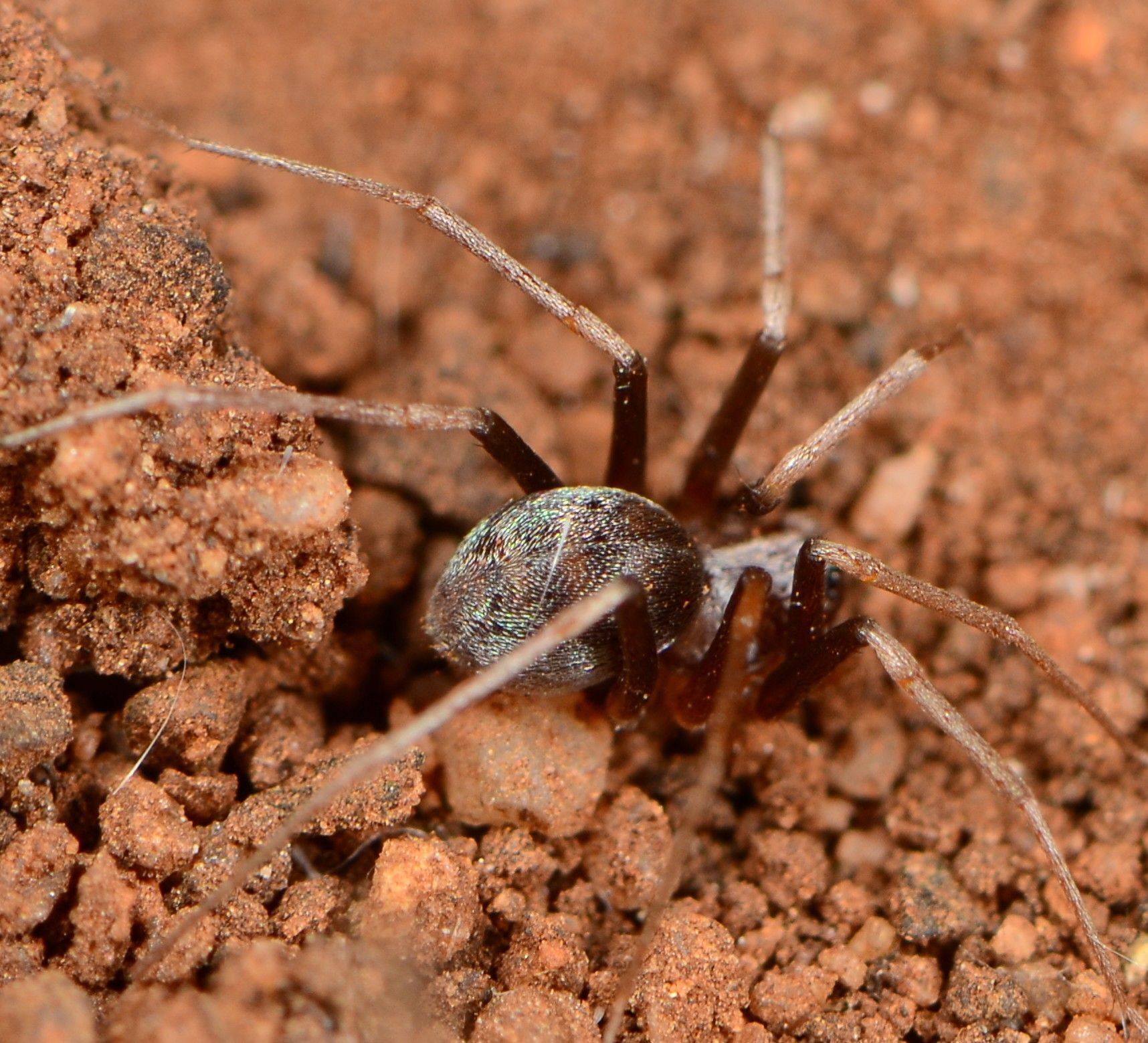
- Female R. robinae

Scientific classification
- Kingdom: Animalia
- Phylum: Arthropoda
- Subphylum: Chelicerata
- Class: Arachnida
- Order: Araneae
- Infraorder: Araneomorphae
- Family: Zodariidae
- Genus: Ranops; Jocqué

Type species
- Ranops caprivi

Species
- 5, see text

= Ranops =

Genus of spiders

Ranops is a genus of southern African spiders in the family Zodariidae. It was first described in 1991 by Jocqué.

== Species ==
As of September 2025, this genus includes five species:

- Ranops caprivi Jocqué, 1991 – Namibia, Zimbabwe (type species)
- Ranops dippenaarae Russell-Smith & Jocqué, 2015 – Tanzania
- Ranops robinae Jocqué & Henrard, 2020 – South Africa
- Ranops tharinae Jocqué & Henrard, 2020 – Botswana
- Ranops wandae Jocqué & Henrard, 2020 – Namibia
