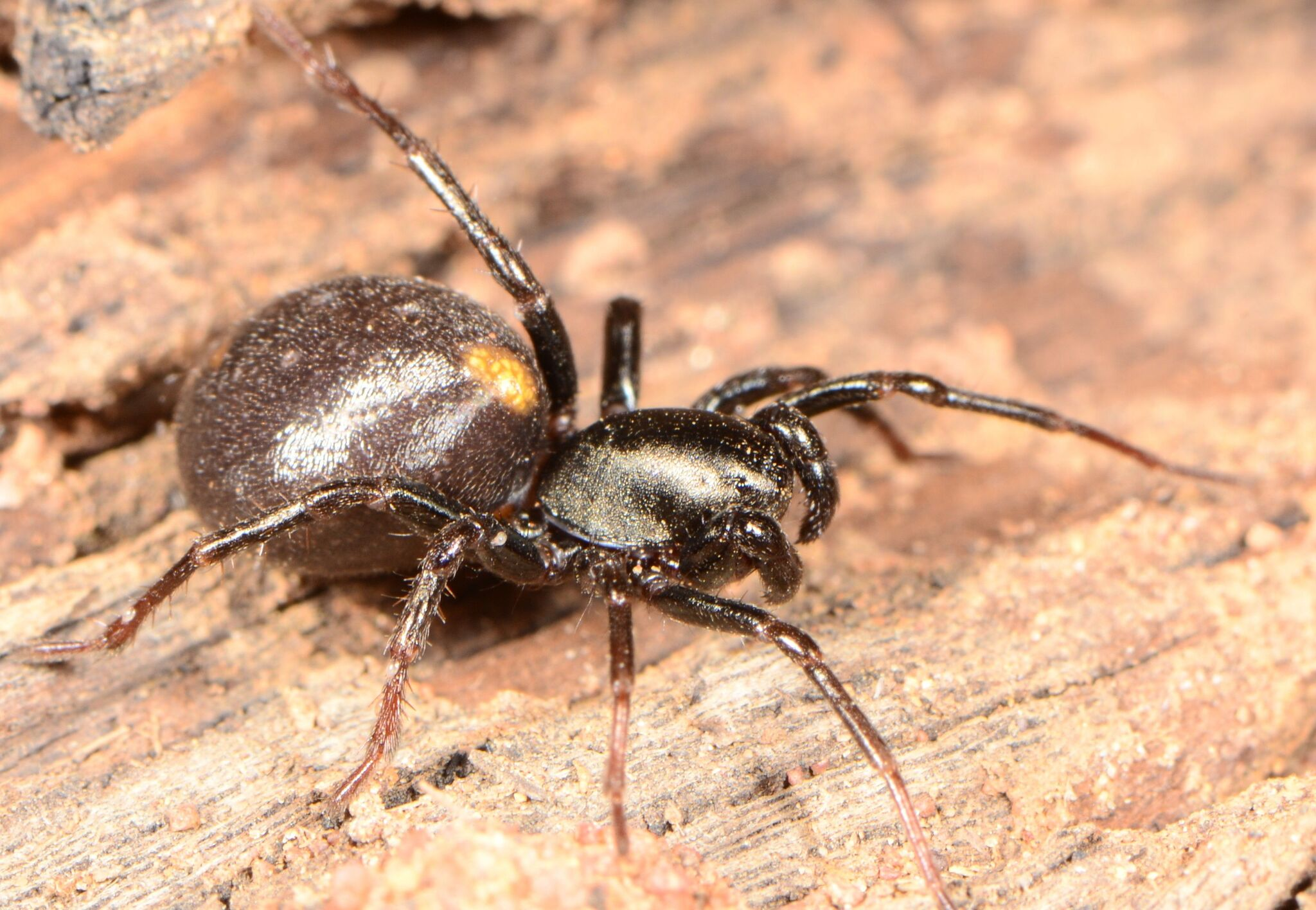
- Female
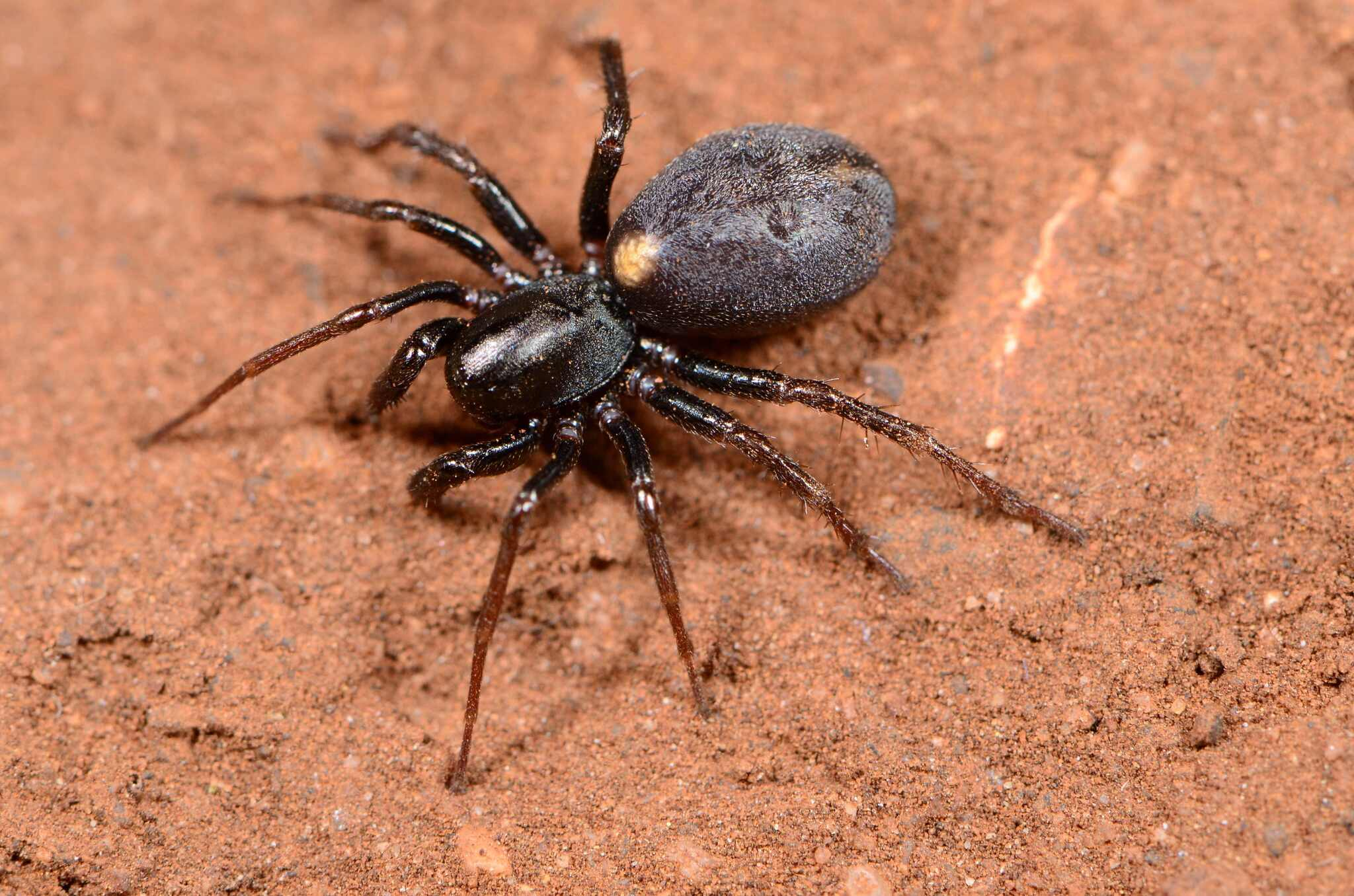
- Female

Scientific classification
- Kingdom: Animalia
- Phylum: Arthropoda
- Subphylum: Chelicerata
- Class: Arachnida
- Order: Araneae
- Infraorder: Araneomorphae
- Family: Zodariidae
- Genus: Systenoplacis
- Species: S. vandami

Binomial name
- Systenoplacis vandami (Hewitt, 1916)

Synonyms
- Cydrela vandami Hewitt, 1916

= Systenoplacis vandami =

Roodeplaat Systenoplacis zodariid spider

Species of spider

Systenoplacis vandami is a species of spider from the Zodariidae family. It is endemic to South Africa and is commonly known as the Roodeplaat Systenoplacis zodariid spider.

== Distribution ==
Systenoplacis vandami has a wide distribution across the South African provinces Eastern Cape, Gauteng, KwaZulu-Natal, Limpopo, North West, and Northern Cape.

== Habitat ==
The species inhabits multiple biomes including Fynbos, Forest, Indian Ocean Coastal Belt, and Savanna at altitudes ranging from 54 to 1,758 m above sea level.

== Description ==
Systenoplacis vandami shows sexual dimorphism in size. Females reach 9.32 mm in total length with a uniform dark brown carapace and reddish brown chelicerae. The abdomen is dark grey with a white spot in front. Males are considerably smaller at 5.9 mm total length with a medium reddish brown carapace and a clear, well-defined white spot on the abdomen along with three spots in a longitudinal row.

== Ecology ==
Systenoplacis vandami are free-running ground spiders. It is presumed that their large pedipalps are used for digging, which has been observed in grassland habitats.

== Conservation ==
The species is listed as Least Concern by the South African National Biodiversity Institute due to its wide geographical range. It is protected in six protected areas.
