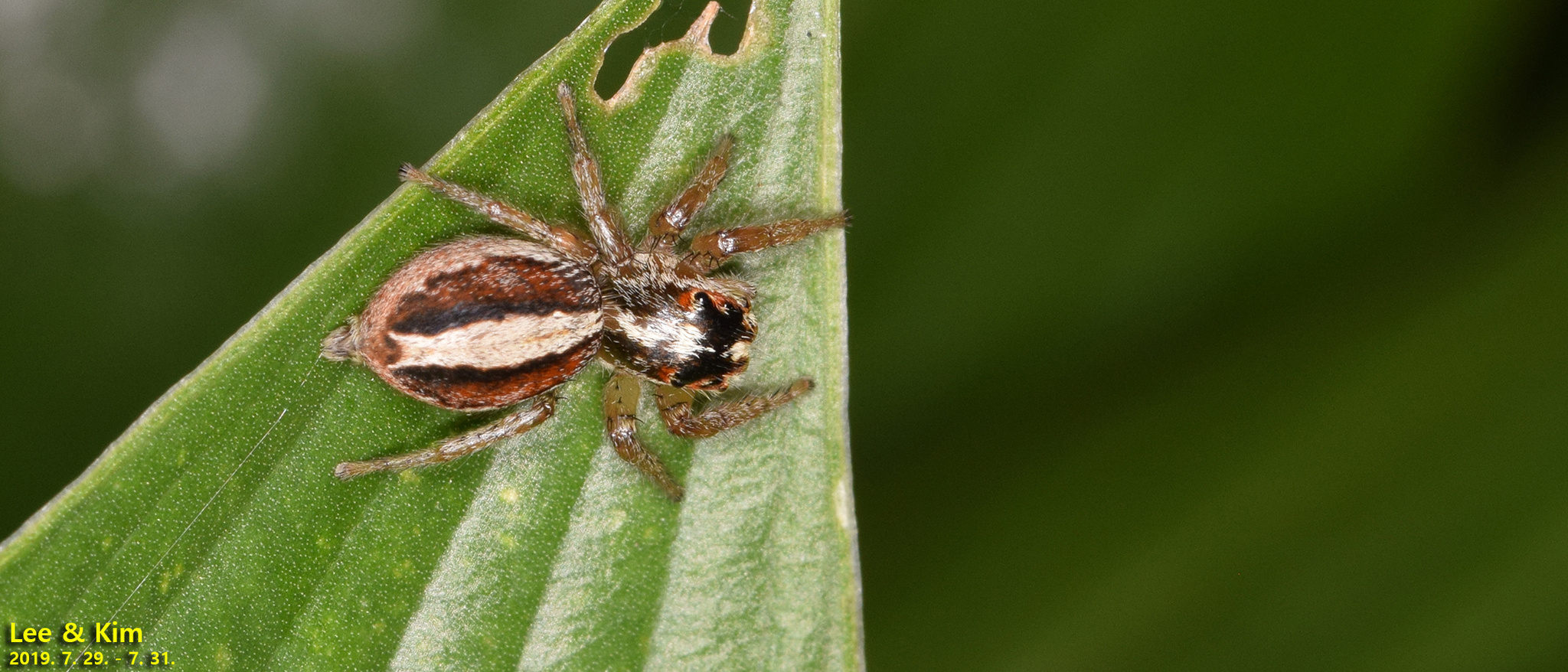
- Plexippoides regius in South Korea

Scientific classification
- Kingdom: Animalia
- Phylum: Arthropoda
- Subphylum: Chelicerata
- Class: Arachnida
- Order: Araneae
- Infraorder: Araneomorphae
- Family: Salticidae
- Genus: Plexippoides
- Species: P. regius

Binomial name
- Plexippoides regius Wesołowska, 1981

= Plexippoides regius =

Species of spider

Plexippoides regius (Korean: 왕어리두줄깡충거미; RR: Wangeoridujulkkangchunggeomi) is a species of jumping spider in the genus Plexippoides. The species was first described by Wanda Wesołowska in 1981 based on specimens from North Korea but its distribution has been extended to include China, Russia and South Korea, with examples found as far as Sichuan. The spider is small, with a body length between 6.9 and 8.65 mm (0.27 and 0.34 in), the female being generally larger than the male. It is distinguished by the two brown lines that stretch across the back of its carapace and abdomen that is recalled in its Korean name. Otherwise, the spider varies in coloration, with some examples having an orange or yellow-brown carapace and others dark brown. The male has a long embolus that encircles the palpal bulb. The female has complex seminal ducts that lead to heavily sclerotised and many-chambered spermathecae.

== Taxonomy ==
Plexippoides regius is a species of jumping spider that was first described in 1981 by Wanda Wesołowska. It is one of over 500 species identified by the Polish arachnologist. She initially described it as a nomen nudum, placed in the genus Plexippoides. The genus was first proposed by Jerzy Prószyński in 1977, but was not fully circumscribed until 1984. The genus name is a Greek word that can be translated "of a form similar to plexippus". The word plexippus can be translated striking or driving horses. It was the name of a number of heroes in Homer's Iliad. Plexippus is a related genus first raised by Carl Ludwig Koch in 1846.

In 2003, Wayne Maddison and Marshall Hedin identified a phylogenetic relationship between nearly 800 species of jumping spider, which they grouped together as Plexippoida. This was consolidated as the tribe Plexippini by Maddison in 2015. The genus Plexippoides was placed in the subtribe Plexippina in the tribe, which was itself listed in the clade Saltafresia. It was allocated to the subclade Simonida, named in honour of the French arachnologist Eugène Simon. In 2016, Prószyński combined it with 40 other genera into the group Hyllines, named after the genus Hyllus. Genetic analysis has found that the species is related to those of the genera Evarcha and Telamonia.

In Korea, the spider is known as the two-lined jumping spider, or wangeoridujulkkangchunggeomi (왕어리두줄깡충거미). Prószyński suggested that spiders identified as Helicius kimjoopili found in Korea are in fact members of this species. This was confirmed and Plexippoides joopili is now a synonym for the species.

== Description ==
Plexippoides regius is a small jumping spider. The male has a body length between 6.9 and 8.55 mm (0.27 and 0.34 in). The spider's body is divided into two main parts: an elongated cephalothorax and an oval abdomen that is narrower to the rear. The cephalothorax measures between 3.3 and 3.91 mm (0.13 and 0.15 in) in length and typically 2.8 and 2.5 mm (0.11 and 0.10 in) in width. The carapace, the hard upper part of the cephalothorax, varies between individual examples, with some being orange or yellow-brown and others dark brown. All have a very dark brown or black eye field. There are two brown bands that mark the carapace from behind the eyes to the rear. The underside, or sternum, is yellow to brown. The chelicerae are reddish-brown and the remainder of the mouthparts brown. The spider has two front teeth and one back tooth. The abdomen is a yellow-brown oval, measuring between 3.59 and 4.07 mm (0.14 and 0.16 in) in length and typically 2.2 mm (0.09 in) wide. The topside is yellow and has a marking of two brown stripes stretching down from front to back and a zigzag pattern on the edges. The underside is yellowish-brown and has a dense covering of dark hairs. The legs and spinnerets are also yellowish-brown, although the legs have a dense covering of thornlike bristles. The pedipalps are yellow with a broad cymbium that protrudes to the end of the tibial spike, or apophysis. The tibial apophysis is noticeably sclerotised. The palpal bulb is nearly spherical and has a long centrally located embolus that encircles it.

The female has a body length between 7.01 and 8.65 mm (0.28 and 0.34 in). The cephalothorax measures between 3.59 and 3.91 mm (0.14 and 0.15 in) in length and typically 2.93 mm (0.12 in) in width, while the abdomen is between 3.91 and 4.56 mm (0.15 and 0.18 in) in length and typically 2.57 mm (0.10 in) in width. The body shape and markings are similar to the male. The orange carapace has two light brown stripes similar to the male and the abdomen has a similar pattern, although lighter. The legs and spinnerets are similarly yellowish-brown. The chelicerae are orange and the spider's face, or clypeus, is yellow. It has a light yellowish-brown sternum shaped like a shield, truncated to the front. The epigyne is a medium-sized oval with a depression towards the front where the copulatory openings can be found. The copulatory openings lead to very coiled insemination ducts. The spermathecae are heavily sclerotised and complex with many chambers.

In shape, Plexippoides regius is typical of the genus, but can be distinguished from other species by the two stripes that mark the abdomen and are recalled in the species name in Korean.

== Distribution and habitat ==
Plexippoides regius is found in China, Korea and Russia. The holotype was collected in North Hamgyong Province in North Korea in 1970. Examples were also identified in other areas of the country, including South Hamgyong Province. The spider was observed living in the cities of Chongjin in 1987 and Pyongyang in 1990, the latter near the Tomb of King Tongmyong. It has been subsequently seen living in four forest sites in South Korea.

The first example of Plexippoides regius to be found in Russia was discovered in Primorsky Krai in 1979 but was not identified as being of this species until 1984. Other examples have been seen in Khabarovsk Krai. It was subsequently found in China. In 2002, specimens were collected in Henan, being discovered in Baligou, Huaiheyuan National Forest Park and the regions around Mount Song. In 2006, further discoveries were made, including in the rural areas of Tongbai. It has also been found in Dengfeng, Huixian, Xinyang, Linzhou, Luanchuan, Lushi, Neixiang, Songxian Jiyuan and Yiyang. Outside Henan, the spider has been spotted in Beijing and the Chinese provinces of Anhui, Hebei, Hubei, Jilin, Shanxi, Sichuan and Zhejiang.

The spider lives in mountain and field grassland. It thrives both in trees and on blades of grass. The spider can be particularly found around shrubs and bushes.
