= Peckhamia wesolowskae =

Scientific classification
- Kingdom: Animalia
- Phylum: Arthropoda
- Subphylum: Chelicerata
- Class: Arachnida
- Order: Araneae
- Infraorder: Araneomorphae
- Family: Salticidae
- Genus: Peckhamia
- Species: P. wesolowskae

Binomial name
- Peckhamia wesolowskae Cala-Riquelme, Bustamante, Crews & Cutler, 2020

Species of spider

Peckhamia wesolowskae is a species of jumping spider in the genus Peckhamia that lives in Cuba. The species was first described in 2020 by Franklyn Cala-Riquelme, Abel Bustamante, Sarah Crews and Bruce Cutler. The spider mimics ants of the Cephalotes genus. It is a small spider, measuring between 3.3 and 4 mm (0.13 and 0.16 in) in length, the female being smaller than the male. The spider is dark reddish in colour, and lacks a distinctive pattern on either the abdomen or carapace. The chelicerae are also reddish and have a distinctive concave central section which helps to distinguish the species from others in the genus. Other distinguishing characteristics for the species include the very long thin embolus of the male and the wide spermathecae in the female.

== Taxonomy ==
Peckhamia wesolowskae is a jumping spider species that was first described by Franklyn Cala-Riquelme, Abel Bustamante, Sarah Crews and Bruce Cutler in 2020. The species is named after the Polish arachnologist Wanda Wesołowska. It was allocated to the genus Peckhamia, which had been first circumscribed by Eugène Simon in 1900. The genus is one of six in the subtribe Synagelina, also circumscribed in 1900, by Frederick Octavius Pickard-Cambridge, in the tribe Dendryphantini. Wayne Maddison listed the tribe in the clade Marpissoida. In 2016, it had been grouped with eight other genera of jumping spiders under the name Euodenines by Jerzy Prószyński. The genus Peckhamia is related to Synageles, with some species transferred between the two due to the similarities between the genera.

== Description ==
Peckhamia wesolowskae is, typically for the genus, a small spider. The male has a total length of 4 mm (0.16 in), divided into a carapace and an abdomen. The dark reddish carapace has a typical length of 1.8 mm (0.071 in) and width of 1.1 mm (0.043 in). The eye field is blacker than the rest of the carapace. The abdomen is similar in color to the carapace, with a scattering of white scales, and is 2 mm (0.079 in) long. It rounded in shape with a constriction half way along and the back fatter than the front. The underside is grey to black. The chelicerae are reddish. The middle of the chelicerae is concave. The spider has two fore teeth and one back tooth. The mouthparts are otherwise grey to pale yellow. The clypeus is plain and high. The legs vary in color. The front legs are yellow to red, the remainder pale gray to dark brown. The palpal bulb has a wide dark retrolateral tibial apophysis and very long thin embolus. The bulb has thick bristles.

The female is smaller, measuring typically 3.3 mm (0.13 in) in length. The carapace is also smaller, measuring 1.6 mm (0.063 in) in length and 0.8 mm (0.031 in) in width, as is the abdomen, which has a length of 1.55 mm (0.061 in) The colouring is similar to the male. The epigyne has large window that takes up most of the plate. Curved copulatory ducts lead to wide spermathecae. The fertilization ducts are far from the copulatory ducts.

The male spiders have a characteristic embolus which enables them to be distinguished from others in the genus. It also separates them from others in related genera, like Admestina, Attidops, Cheliferoides and Synageles. Similarly, the concave shape of the chelicerae make the spider easy to tell from the related Peckhamia areito. The female can be distinguished by the shape of the spermathecae.

Peckhamia wesolowskae resembles ants of the Cephalotes genus, particularly the size and shape of their heads. It will mimic ants both in morphology and behaviour. For example, the species will use its second pair of legs to imitate the antennae of an ant.

== Distribution and habitat ==
Peckhamia wesolowskae is endemic to Cuba. The holotype was found in Pinar del Río Province in 2012. Paratypes have also been found in Artemisa and Matanzas Provinces. The spider seems to prefer living in forests, particularly secondary forests.
