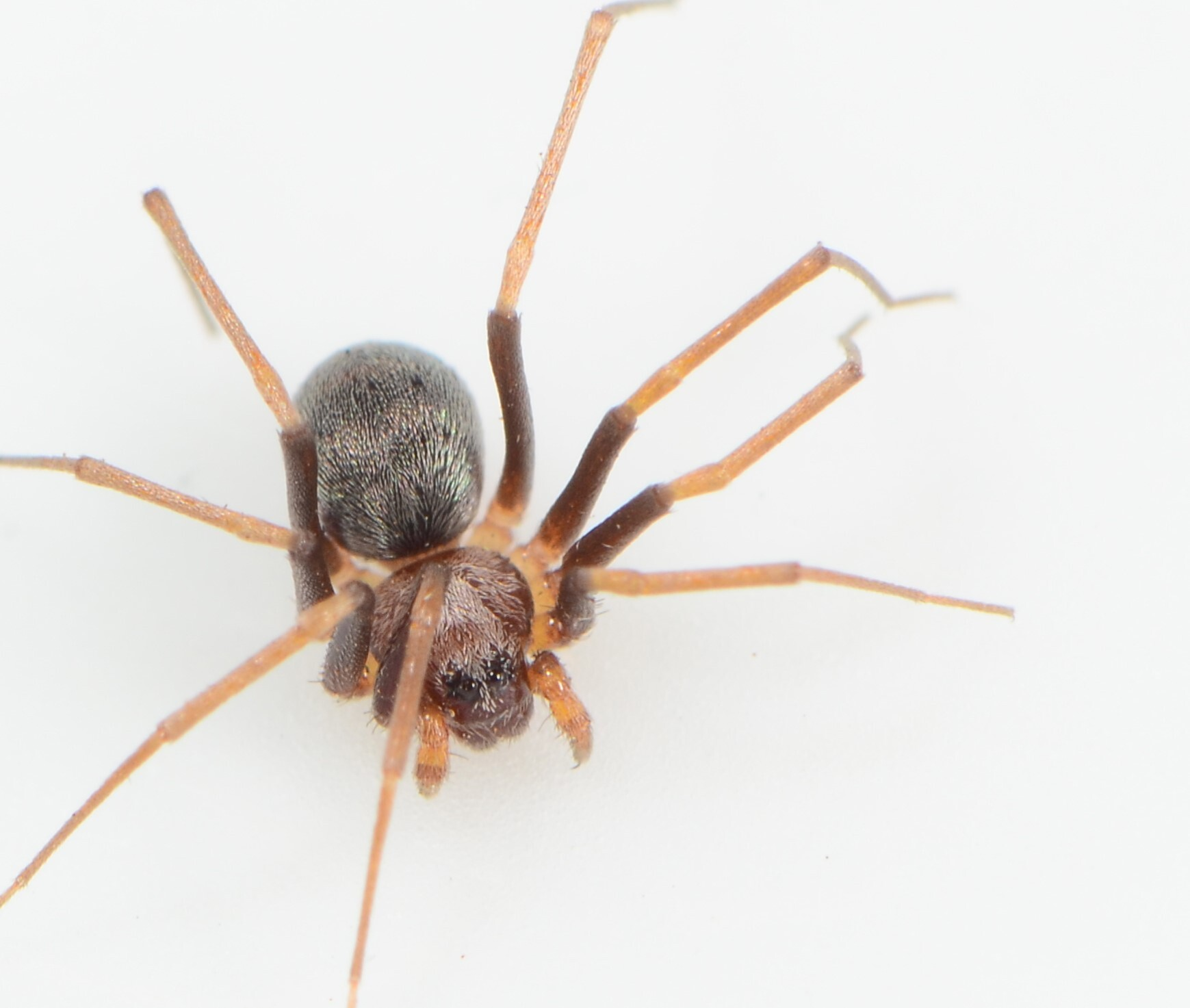
- Female
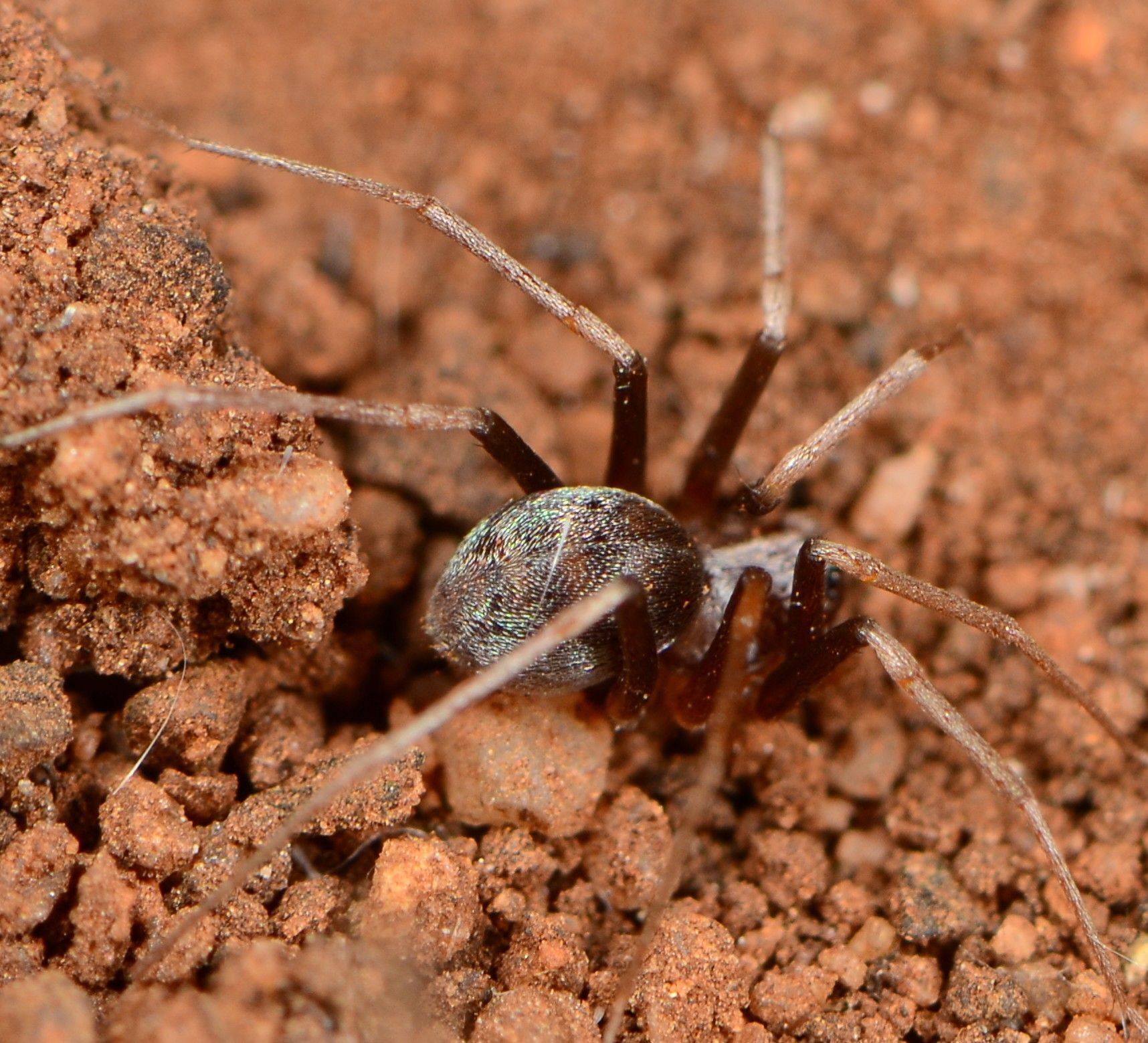
- Female

Scientific classification
- Kingdom: Animalia
- Phylum: Arthropoda
- Subphylum: Chelicerata
- Class: Arachnida
- Order: Araneae
- Infraorder: Araneomorphae
- Family: Zodariidae
- Genus: Ranops
- Species: R. robinae

Binomial name
- Ranops robinae Jocqué & Henrard, 2020

= Ranops robinae =

Robin's frog-eyed ant spider

Species of spider

Ranops robinae is a species of spider in the family Zodariidae. It is endemic to South Africa and is commonly known as Robin's frog-eyed ant spider.

== Distribution ==
Ranops robinae has a wide distribution across five provinces of South Africa: Free State, Gauteng, KwaZulu-Natal, Limpopo, and Mpumalanga.

== Habitat ==
The species inhabits the Grassland and Savanna biomes at altitudes ranging from 119 to 1,698 m above sea level. It has also been recorded from maize fields.

== Description ==
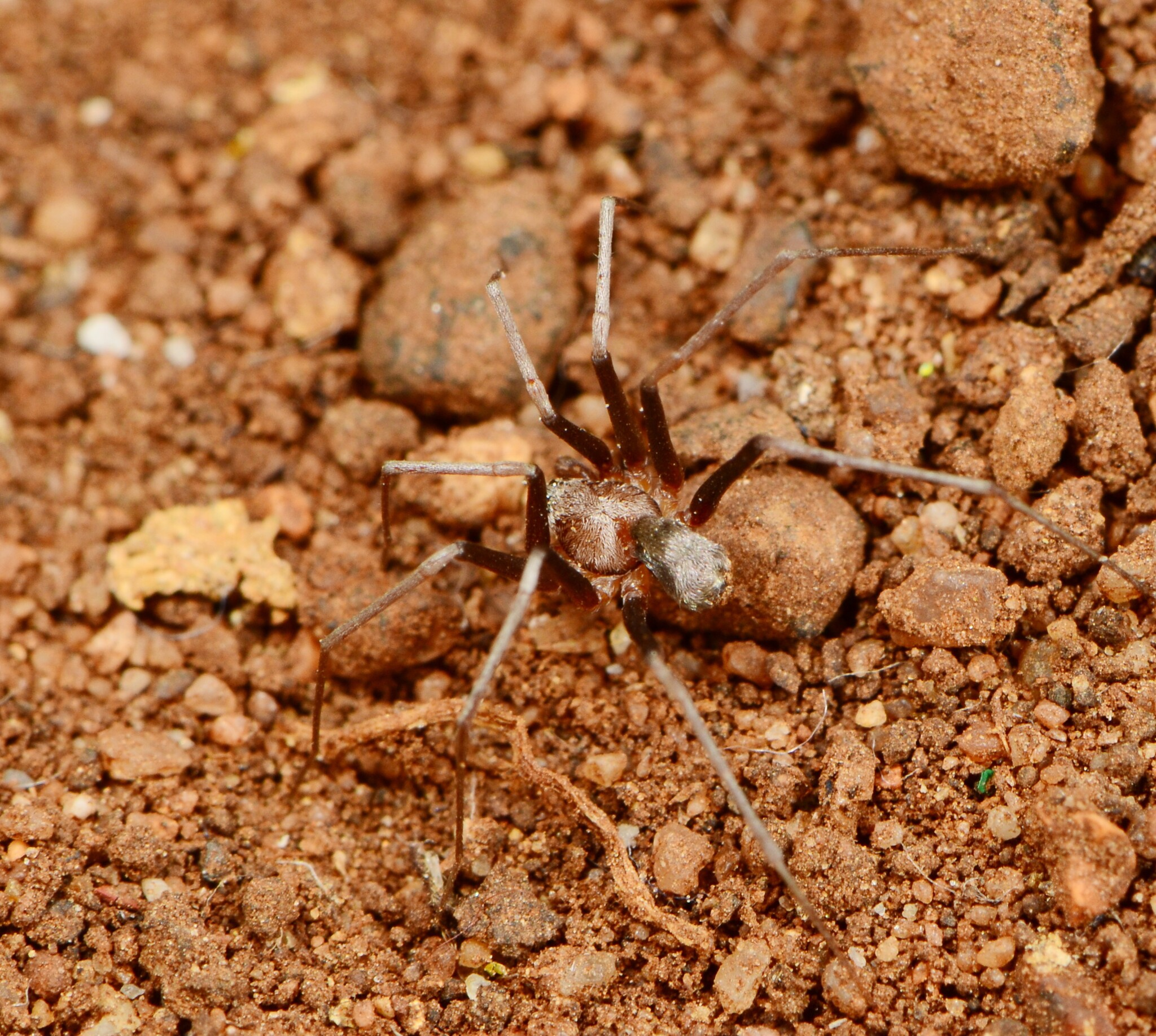
female

Ranops robinae is a small spider with females reaching 3.41 mm and males 3.20 mm in total length. The carapace is medium brown with darker radiating striae, margin, and eye region. The abdomen is dark grey with distinctive brown spots and transverse bars. Males resemble females in general appearance.

== Ecology ==
Ranops robinae are small, free-running ground-dwelling spiders. They are frequently collected using pitfall traps and inhabit both natural grasslands and agricultural areas.

== Conservation ==
The species is listed as Least Concern by the South African National Biodiversity Institute due to its wide geographical range and occurrence in multiple protected areas.
