= Rhenefictus =

Scientific classification
- Kingdom: Animalia
- Phylum: Arthropoda
- Subphylum: Chelicerata
- Class: Arachnida
- Order: Araneae
- Infraorder: Araneomorphae
- Family: Salticidae
- Genus: Rhenefictus; Logunov, 2021
- Species: R. tropicus

Binomial name
- Rhenefictus tropicus Logunov, 2021

Genus of jumping spiders

Rhenefictus is a monotypic genus of Southeast Asian jumping spiders containing the single species, Rhenefictus tropicus. It was first described by Dmitri V. Logunov in 2021, and it has only been found in Vietnam.

== See also ==
- List of Salticidae genera
