= Tartamura =

Scientific classification
- Kingdom: Animalia
- Phylum: Arthropoda
- Subphylum: Chelicerata
- Class: Arachnida
- Order: Araneae
- Infraorder: Araneomorphae
- Family: Salticidae
- Subfamily: Salticinae
- Genus: Tartamura; Bustamante & Ruiz, 2017

Type species
- T. agatelin Bustamante & Ruiz, 2017

Species
- 4, see text

Genus of spiders

Tartamura is a genus of South American jumping spiders first described by A. A. Bustamante & Gustavo Rodrigo Sanches Ruiz in 2017. Tartamura was placed in the tribe Thiodinini, part of the Amycoida clade of the subfamily Salticinae in Maddison's 2015 classification of the family Salticidae.

== Species ==
As of April 2019 it contains four species:

- Tartamura adfectuosa (Galiano, 1977) — Argentina
- Tartamura agatelin Bustamante & Ruiz, 2017 — Ecuador
- Tartamura huao Bustamante & Ruiz, 2017 — Ecuador
- Tartamura metzneri Bustamante & Ruiz, 2017 — Brazil
