= Astia =

Scientific classification
- Kingdom: Animalia
- Phylum: Arthropoda
- Subphylum: Chelicerata
- Class: Arachnida
- Order: Araneae
- Infraorder: Araneomorphae
- Family: Salticidae
- Genus: Astia; L. Koch, 1879
- Species: A. hariola

Binomial name
- Astia hariola L. Koch, 1879

Genus of spiders

Astia is a monotypic genus of Australian jumping spiders containing the single species, Astia hariola. It was first described by Ludwig Carl Christian Koch in 1879, and is only found in New South Wales and Queensland. They are noticeable by the patterns on the dorsal surface of the abdomen that are either a creamy white or orange pale patch.
