= Padilla (spider) =

Scientific classification
- Kingdom: Animalia
- Phylum: Arthropoda
- Subphylum: Chelicerata
- Class: Arachnida
- Order: Araneae
- Infraorder: Araneomorphae
- Family: Salticidae
- Subfamily: Salticinae
- Genus: Padilla; Peckham & Peckham, 1894

Type species
- P. armata Peckham & Peckham, 1894

Species
- 19, see text

Genus of spiders

Padilla is a genus of jumping spiders that was first described by George and Elizabeth Peckham in 1894. Most males have a characteristic long, forward projecting process on each chelicera that looks like a lance that is bent near the tip. The exception is P. javana, that doesn't have this feature.

Proszynski drew the genitalia of both genders in 1987, and they resemble those of Marengo.

== Species ==
As of August 2019 it contains nineteen species, most endemic to Madagascar, and one species only occurring on Java:

- Padilla ambigua Ledoux, 2007 – Réunion
- Padilla armata Peckham & Peckham, 1894 (type) – Madagascar
- Padilla astina Andriamalala, 2007 – Madagascar
- Padilla boritandroka Andriamalala, 2007 – Madagascar
- Padilla cornuta (Peckham & Peckham, 1885) – Madagascar
- Padilla foty Andriamalala, 2007 – Madagascar
- Padilla graminicola Ledoux, 2007 – Réunion
- Padilla griswoldi Andriamalala, 2007 – Madagascar
- Padilla javana Simon, 1900 – Indonesia (Java)
- Padilla lavatandroka Andriamalala, 2007 – Madagascar
- Padilla maingoka Andriamalala, 2007 – Madagascar
- Padilla manjelatra Andriamalala, 2007 – Madagascar
- Padilla mazavaloha Andriamalala, 2007 – Madagascar
- Padilla mihaingo Andriamalala, 2007 – Madagascar
- Padilla mitohy Andriamalala, 2007 – Madagascar
- Padilla ngeroka Andriamalala, 2007 – Madagascar
- Padilla ombimanga Andriamalala, 2007 – Madagascar
- Padilla rhizophorae Dierkens, 2014 – Comoros, Mayotte
- Padilla sartor Simon, 1900 – Madagascar
