= Parahelpis =

Scientific classification
- Kingdom: Animalia
- Phylum: Arthropoda
- Subphylum: Chelicerata
- Class: Arachnida
- Order: Araneae
- Infraorder: Araneomorphae
- Family: Salticidae
- Subfamily: Salticinae
- Genus: Parahelpis; Gardzińska & Zabka, 2010

Type species
- P. abnormis (Zabka, 2002)

Species
- P. abnormis (Zabka, 2002) – Australia (Queensland); P. smithae Gardzińska & Zabka, 2010 – Australia (New South Wales)

Genus of spiders

Parahelpis is a genus of Australian jumping spiders that was first described by Joanna Gardzińska & Marek Michał Żabka in 2010. As of August 2019 it contains only two species, found only in New South Wales and Queensland: P. abnormis and P. smithae.
