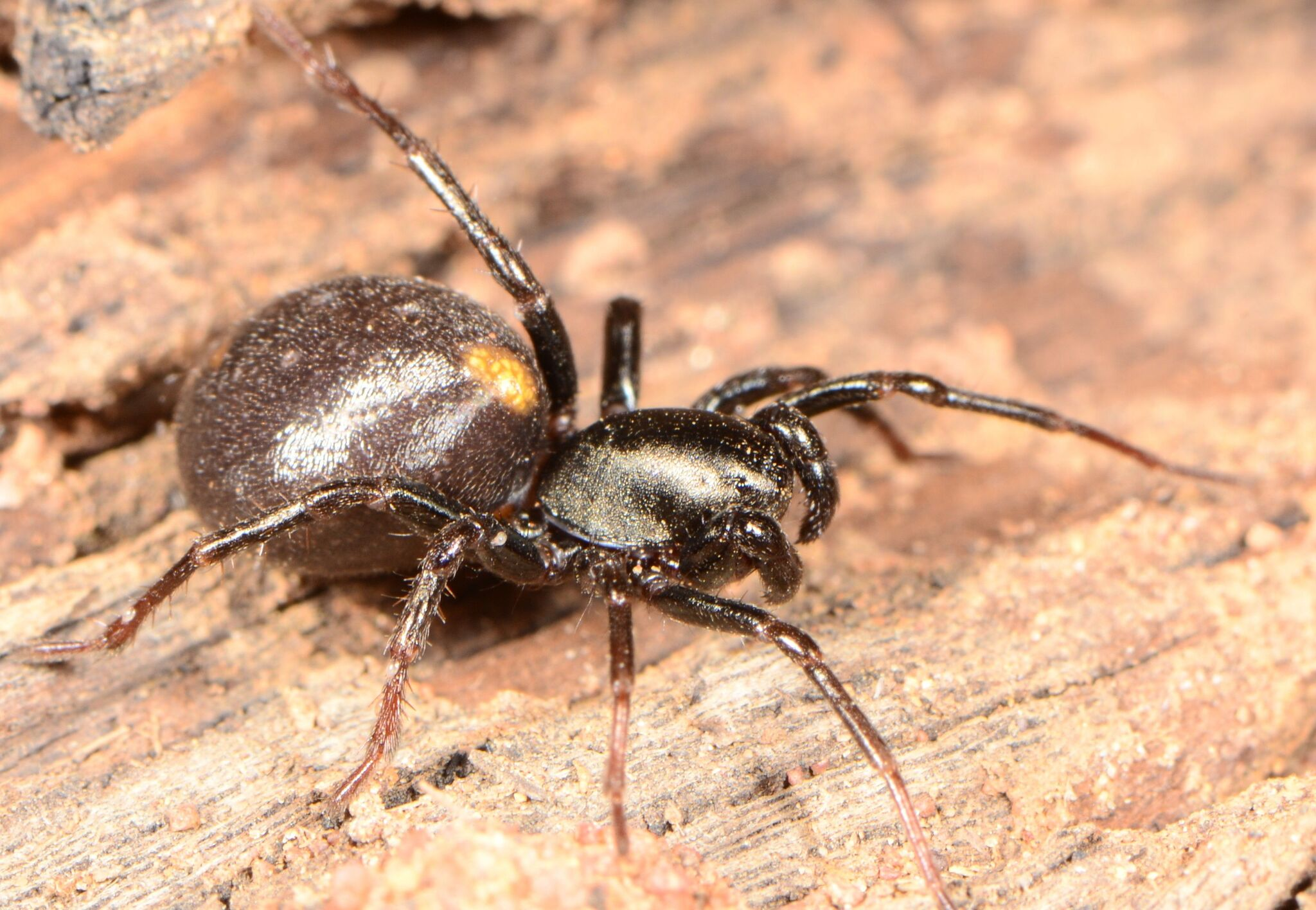
- Female S. vandami
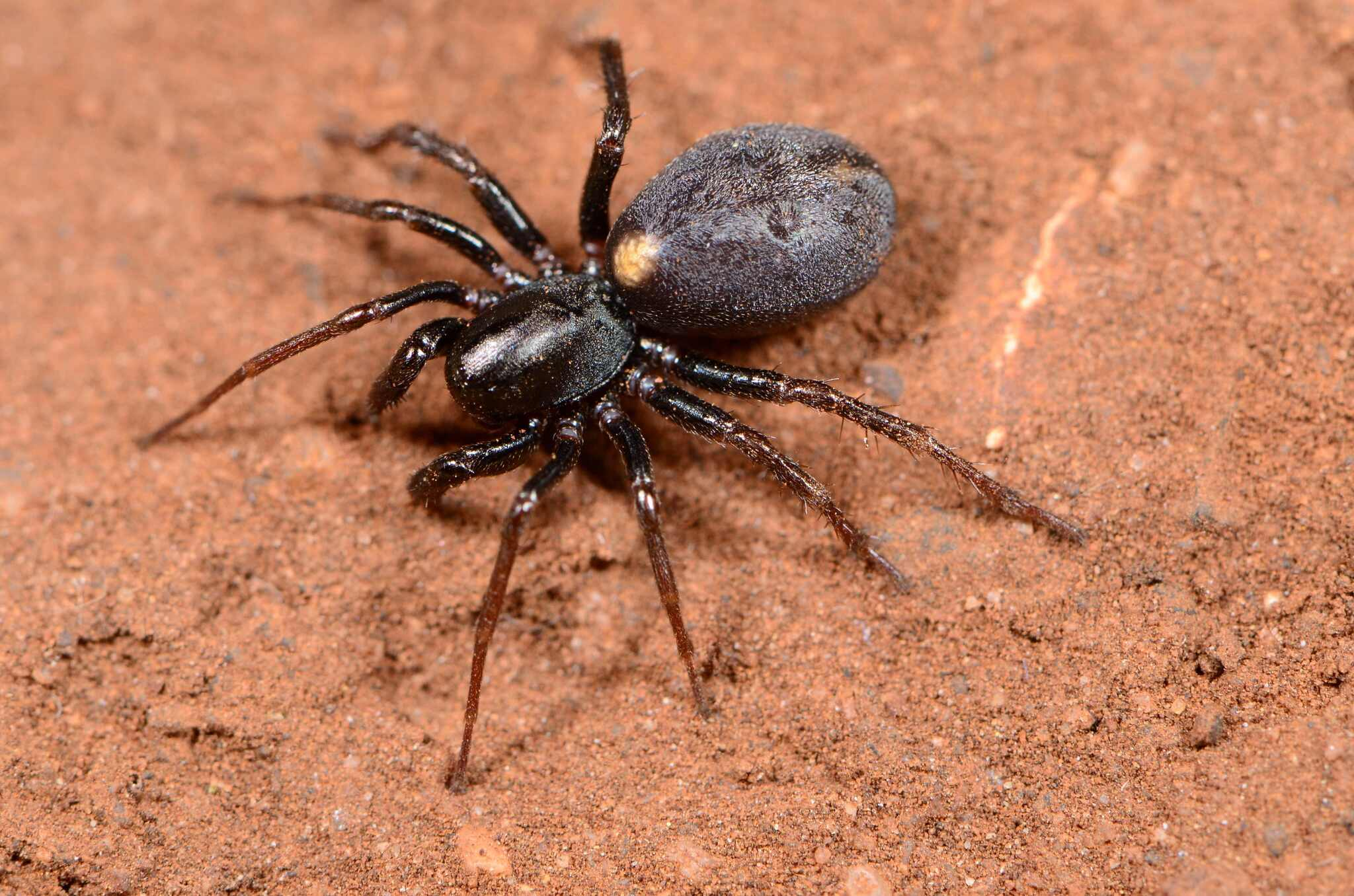
- Female S. vandami

Scientific classification
- Kingdom: Animalia
- Phylum: Arthropoda
- Subphylum: Chelicerata
- Class: Arachnida
- Order: Araneae
- Infraorder: Araneomorphae
- Family: Zodariidae
- Genus: Systenoplacis; Simon

Type species
- Systenoplacis septemguttatus

Species
- 22, see text

= Systenoplacis =

Genus of spiders

Systenoplacis is a genus of spiders in the family Zodariidae with 22 African species.

== Species ==
As of September 2025, this genus includes 22 species:

- Systenoplacis biguttatus Jocqué, 2009 – Cameroon
- Systenoplacis biunguis (Strand, 1913) – Central Africa
- Systenoplacis fagei (Lawrence, 1937) – South Africa
- Systenoplacis falconeri (Caporiacco, 1949) – Kenya
- Systenoplacis giltayi (Lessert, 1929) – DR Congo
- Systenoplacis howelli Jocqué, 2009 – Tanzania
- Systenoplacis maculatus (Marx, 1893) – Central, East Africa
- Systenoplacis manga Jocqué, 2009 – Tanzania
- Systenoplacis maritimus Jocqué, 2009 – Tanzania
- Systenoplacis michielsi Jocqué, 2009 – Kenya
- Systenoplacis microguttatus Jocqué, 2009 – Tanzania
- Systenoplacis minimus Jocqué, 2009 – Tanzania
- Systenoplacis multipunctatus (Berland, 1920) – Kenya
- Systenoplacis obstructus Jocqué, 2009 – Tanzania
- Systenoplacis patens Jocqué, 2009 – Tanzania
- Systenoplacis quinqueguttatus Jocqué, 2009 – Nigeria
- Systenoplacis scharffi Jocqué, 2009 – Tanzania
- Systenoplacis septemguttatus Simon, 1907 – Guinea-Bissau (type species)
- Systenoplacis thea Jocqué, 2009 – Tanzania
- Systenoplacis turbatus Jocqué, 2009 – Ivory Coast
- Systenoplacis vandami (Hewitt, 1916) – South Africa
- Systenoplacis waruii Jocqué, 2009 – Kenya, Tanzania
