= Wanda Wesołowska =

Polish zoologist (born 1950)

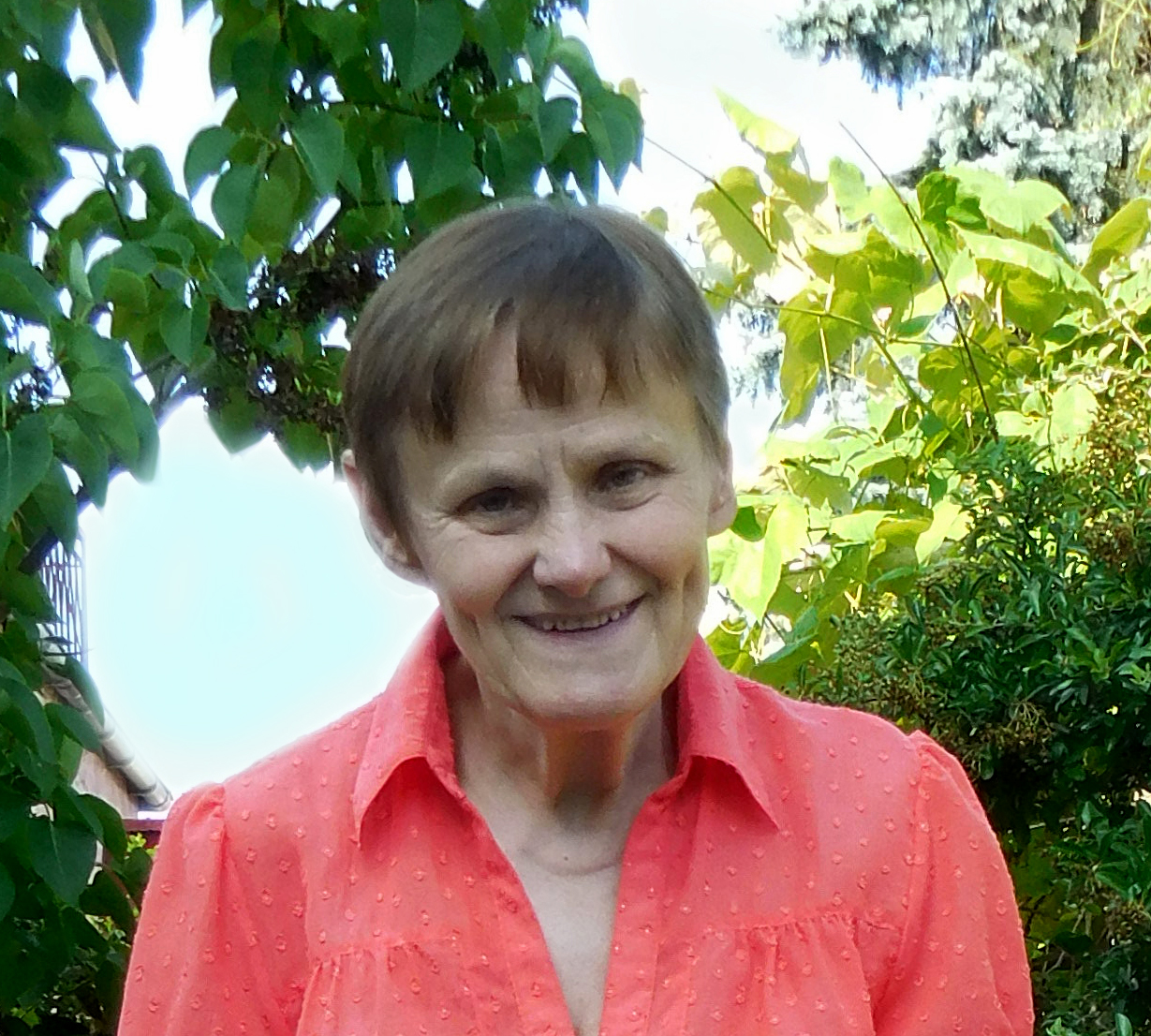
- Wesołowska in 2019
- Born: Wanda Nowysz; 11 August 1950 (age 75); Włocławek, Poland
- Education: Adam Mickiewicz University in Poznań; University of Wrocław
- Scientific career
- Fields: Arachnology
- Institutions: University of Wrocław
- Thesis: A revision of the genus Heliophanus CL Koch, 1833 (Aranei: Salticidae) (1984)

Wanda Wesołowska (born 11 August 1950) is a Polish zoologist known for her work with jumping spiders. She has described more species of jumping spider than any contemporary writer, and is second only to Eugène Simon in the history of arachnology. Originally a student of ornithology, she developed an interest in jumping spiders while still a student at the Siedlce University of Natural Sciences and Humanities in the 1970s.

Wesołowska published her first work in 1981, which included the description of nine new species of spiders, the first in what would be a prolific career. She moved to the University of Wrocław to continue her studies, and completed her doctoral thesis that described 44 new species of the genus Heliophanus. She joined the faculty of the University of Wrocław in 1985, received a habilitation in 2000, and remained a tenured professor at the university until her retirement in 2020.

Her research has focused on the description, taxonomy and zoogeography of jumping spiders, and has included extensive work on African genera like Menemerus and Pachyballus. Wesołowska has identified more than 500 species, half of all those being from South Africa, and more than 20 species have been named after her.

== Early life ==
Wanda Wesołowska (née Nowysz) was born on 11 August 1950 in Włocławek, Poland. As a child she lived in Szczecin and, in 1968, she started studying biology at the Faculty of Biology and Earth Sciences in Adam Mickiewicz University in Poznań. Her original interest was ornithology. She achieved her MSc in Biology for her work Obserwacje ptaków wodno-błotnych zbiornika zaporowego na Wiśle pod Włocławkiem w okresie wędrówek ("Observations of Wetland Birds on a Dam Reservoir on the Vistula River in Wloclawek during Migration"), which was published in Acta Zoologica Cracoviensia in 1973.

== Career ==
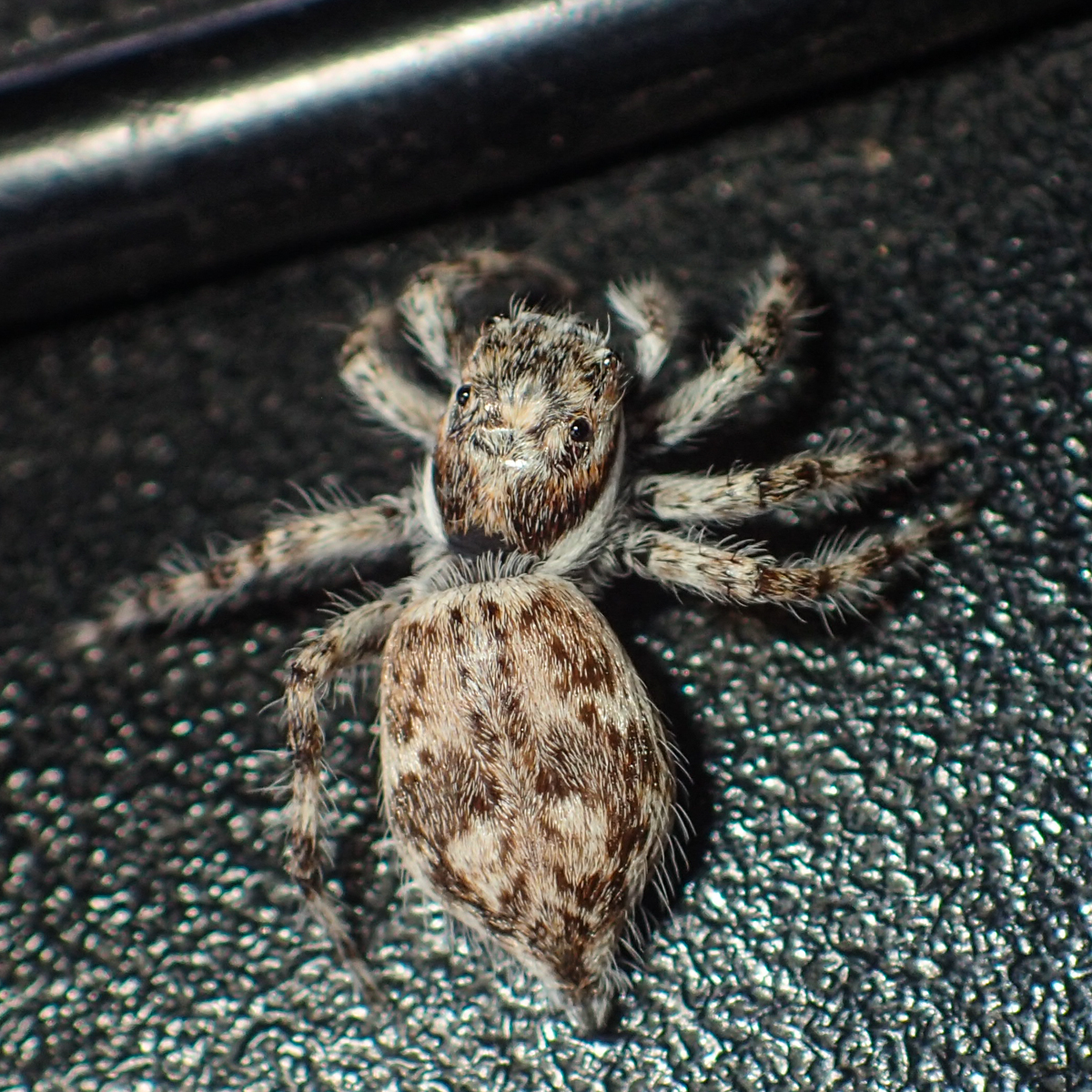
Menemerus nigli, first described by Wesołowska in 2012

After graduating, Wesołowska started work at what is now the University of Natural Sciences and Humanities (then Wyższa Szkoła Pedagogiczno-Rolnicza) in Siedlce, where she met Jerzy Prószyński. Prószyński introduced her to the jumping spider family (Salticidae), which launched her lifelong interest in the family. She stayed at Siedlce from 1973 until moving to the University of Wroclaw in 1978 to start her doctoral studies and published her first paper on jumping spiders in 1981. The paper included descriptions of nine new species, including Euophrys pygmaea and Icius parvus, which were both later moved to the genus Phintella, and Plexippoides regius.

Wesołowska achieved a doctorate in natural sciences in 1984, with a thesis looking at the genus Heliophanus, a genus of jumping spider that occurs across the Afrotropical and Palearctic realms. It is one of the largest and most species-rich genera in the family. In the work, she revisited the entire taxonomy of the genus and described 109 species, of which 44 were new, and was awarded a prize by the Ministry of Science and High Education for her work. In 1985, she was hired as a senior research assistant at the university, subsequently entering tenure track as assistant professor and associate professor. In 2000, she was awarded habilitation on the basis of her work A Revision of the Spider Genus Menemerus in Africa (Araneae: Salticidae), published in the Genus, and in 2009 was promoted to the rank of profesor, the highest academic rank in Poland awarded by the President.

== Research ==
Most of Wesołowska's research covers the taxonomy, characteristics, behaviour and zoogeography of jumping spiders. She has worked with 24 other scientists from countries from Austria to Zimbabwe and is the author and co-author of over 120 works. As of January 2023, according to the World Spider Catalog, Wesołowska is responsible for naming 572 species and 40 genera. No other contemporary figure has described more new species and genera of jumping spiders. Only Eugène Simon, who described over 1000 species and 200 genera, has more to his name.

Wesołowska initially focused on the study of spiders in the Palearctic realm, in both Europe and Asia, and undertook pioneering research on the species in the Middle East between 2002 and 2020. She has also made a particular impact on the understanding of jumping spiders in Africa. She is the author or co-author of half of all studies of South African jumping spider species, completed descriptive catalogues of spiders indigenous to African countries, including a study of over 100 spiders in Ivory Coast, and completed revisions of the taxonomy of African species in various jumping spider genera, including Mexcala, in 2009, Pochytoides, in 2018, and Pachyballus and Peplometus in 2020. Another area of her interest is spider behaviour, and she has published articles about the way that spiders mimic ants and beetles, and studies of those that specialise in eating termites and female mosquitos.

== Legacy ==
In 2020, Wesołowska was awarded the Lawrence Certificate of Merit by the African Arachnological Society for her contributions to the study of African spiders and a festschrift was published in her honour by the journal Zootaxa, with 41 authors submitting papers to the special edition. In recognition of her endeavours in the field, two genera of jumping spiders, Wandawe and Wesolowskana, have been dedicated to her.

The following species of jumping spiders have also been named after her:

- Atomosphyrus wandae Bustamante & Ruiz, 2020
- Eburneana wandae Szűts, 2003
- Heliophanus wesolowskae Rakov & Logunov 1997
- Marma wesolowskae Salgado & Ruiz, 2020
- Neaetha wesolowskae Żabka & Patoleta, 2020
- Padilla wandae Azarkina & Haddad, 2020
- Pancorius wesolowskae Wang & Wang, 2020
- Parahelpis wandae Patoleta & Żabka, 2020
- Peckhamia wesolowskae Cala-Riquelme, Bustamante, Crews & Cutler, 2020
- Plexippus wesolowskae Biswas & Raychaudhuri, 1998
- Proszynellus wandae Patoleta & Żabka, 2015
- Pseudicius wesolowskae Zhu & Song, 2001
- Rhenefictus wandae (Wang & Li, 2021)
- Stenaelurillus wandae Logunov 2020
- Thyenula wesolowskae Zhang & Maddison, 2012

Some of these, including Stenaelurillus wandae, were specifically named in honour of her 70th birthday.

She has also been honoured in the names of other spiders. The list includes the species Cybaeota wesolowskae, two species of ant spiders, Ranops wandae and Zodarion wesolowskae, the crab spider Parabomis wandae, the crevice weaver Sahastata wesolowskae and the long-jawed orb weaver Diphya wesolowskae.

== Private life ==
Wesołowska met her husband Tomasz while a student of ornithology, with whom she shared a passion for the subject. They co-authored three papers on birds in 1972 and 1973, she being lead author in all cases. They moved as a family with her career and continued to share an interest in academic research. They celebrated their 40th wedding anniversary with a joint publication on the ecology of the flatworm Leucochloridium and its effect on the behaviour of the snail Succinea putris. The couple's academic interest have also been passed to their daughter Olga, who is a member of staff at the Department of Biophysics and Neurobiology at the Wrocław Medical University.
