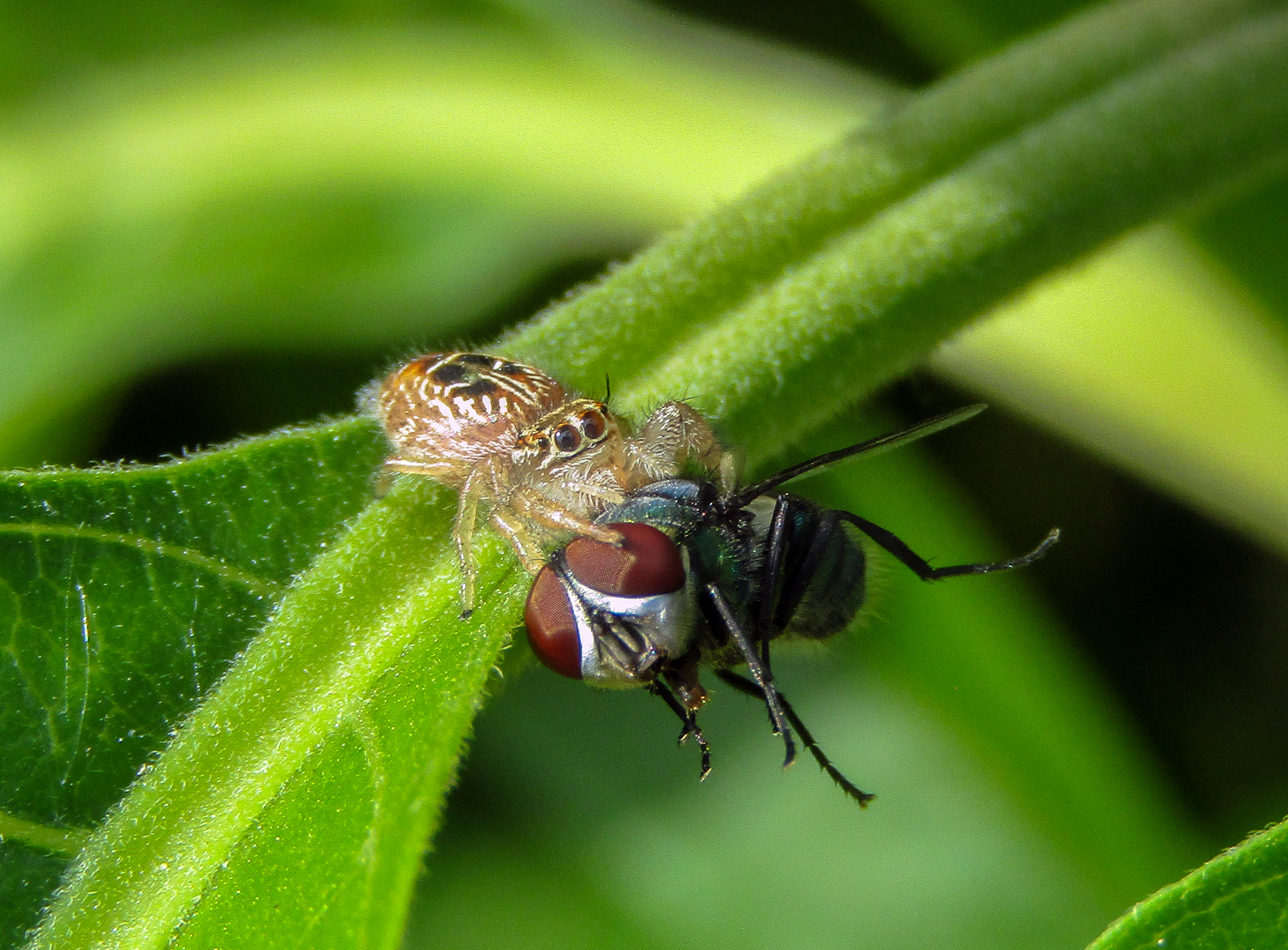
- female with prey
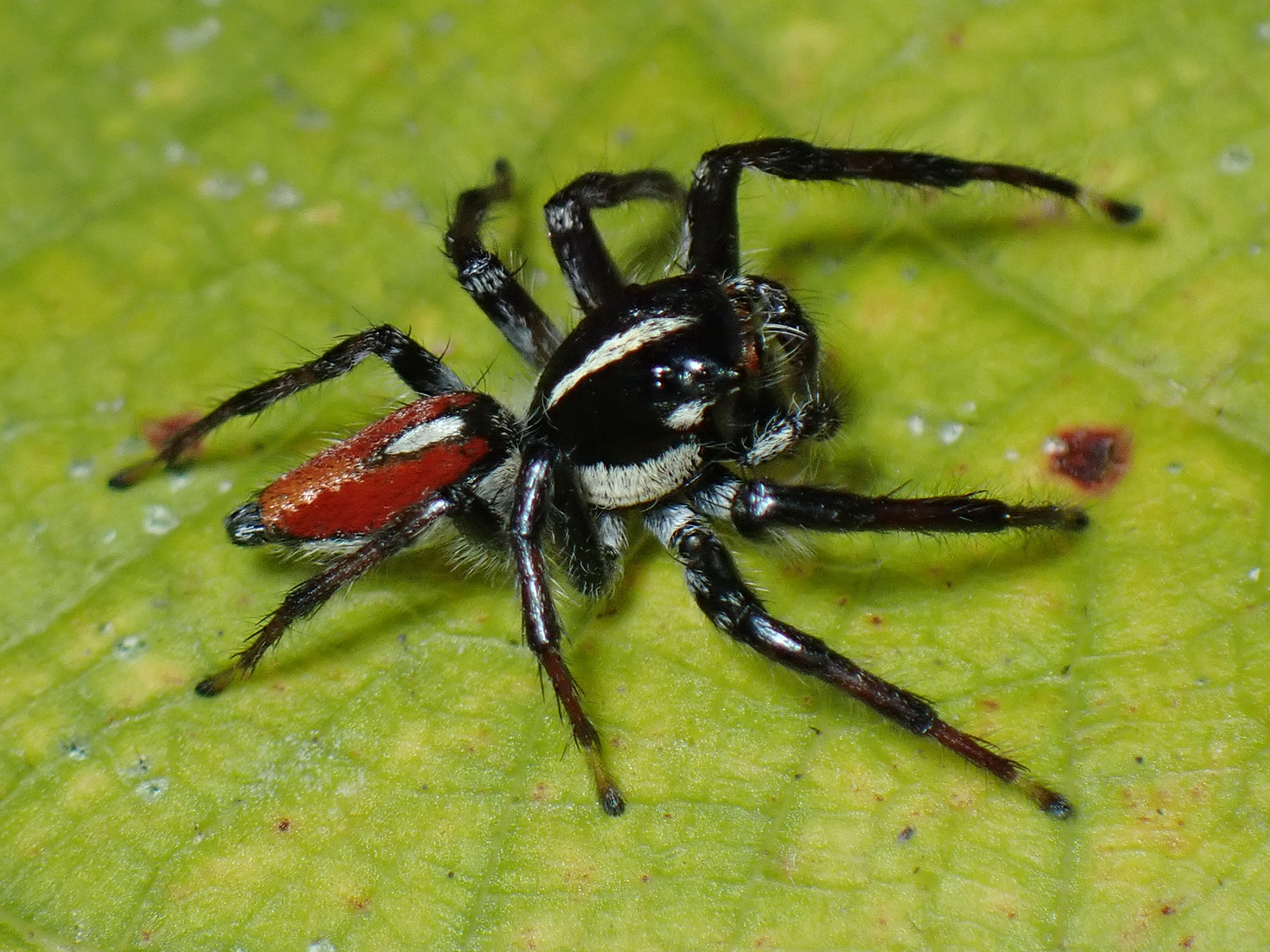
- male from Belize

Scientific classification
- Kingdom: Animalia
- Phylum: Arthropoda
- Subphylum: Chelicerata
- Class: Arachnida
- Order: Araneae
- Infraorder: Araneomorphae
- Family: Salticidae
- Genus: Frigga
- Species: F. pratensis

Binomial name
- Frigga pratensis (Peckham & Peckham, 1885)

Synonyms
- Hyllus pratensis Peckham & Peckham, 1885; Cytaea concinna Peckham & Peckham, 1885; Cyrene pratensis (Peckham & Peckham, 1885); Phiale pratensis (Peckham & Peckham, 1885); Cyrene dolosa Banks, 1909; Phiale dolosa (Banks, 1909); Phiale olomegae Kraus, 1955

= Frigga pratensis =

Species of jumping spider

Frigga pratensis is a species of jumping spider in the family Salticidae. It was originally described as Hyllus pratensis by George and Elizabeth Peckham in 1885 from Guatemala and has since been found throughout Central America and northern South America.

== Taxonomy ==
The species has a complex taxonomic history, having been placed in several different genera since its original description. It was first described as Hyllus pratensis in 1885, with the female form simultaneously described as Cytaea concinna. The species was later transferred to the genus Cyrene, then to Phiale, before finally being placed in its current genus Frigga by Galiano in 1979.

Several other species have been synonymized with F. pratensis over time, including Cyrene dolosa Banks, 1909 and Phiale olomegae Kraus, 1955, which were recognized as junior synonyms when Galiano revised the genus.

== Distribution ==
F. pratensis is found from Mexico south to Colombia, making it one of the more widely distributed species in the genus Frigga. The species has been recorded from various countries throughout Central America including Guatemala, Costa Rica, and El Salvador.

== Description ==
Frigga pratensis is a medium-sized jumping spider showing notable sexual dimorphism in both size and coloration. Males have a total length of approximately 10 mm with an abdomen width of 3 mm, while females are slightly smaller at about 8 mm total length with an abdomen width of 2.2 mm.

The cephalothorax is high and convex in both sexes, being widest at the dorsal eyes and more contracted at the front than behind. The eye arrangement follows the typical salticid pattern with four rows of eyes, though the specific proportions differ between males and females.

=== Male ===
Male coloration is quite striking. The cephalothorax is black with three wide white bands: a central band beginning in the middle of the eye area and lateral bands beginning under the dorsal eyes, all extending to the posterior border. The abdomen is rich red in color, encircled by a black band, with a central white longitudinal stripe running its full length. The legs, palpi and chelicerae are brown, while other body parts vary from light brown to black.

=== Female ===
Females have more subdued coloration compared to males. The cephalothorax is black with reddish sides covered in white hairs. A red band crosses above the first row of eyes and extends back on each side to the dorsal eyes. There is a longitudinal white band, widest in the middle and tapering at the ends, which begins in the middle of the cephalic part and extends nearly to the posterior border. The abdomen is rich red, encircled by a black band below which the sides are white. The anterior middle part features a large white spot that is pointed in front and widens behind, with additional white markings creating a distinctive pattern.

Both sexes display long spines on various leg segments, particularly on the femoral, patellar, tibial and metatarsal joints of all four pairs, with specific arrangements differing between the front and rear leg pairs.
