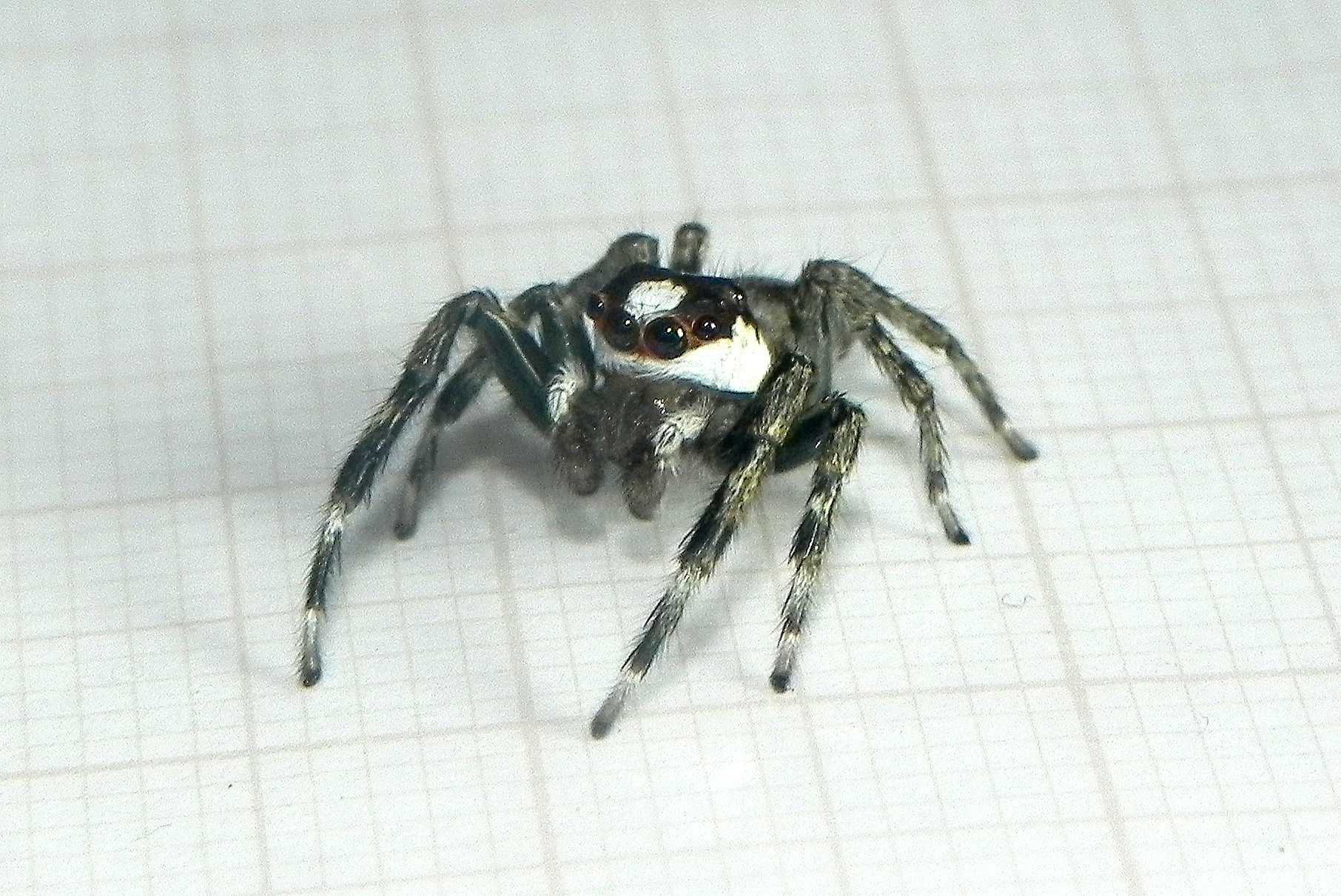
- Male Eustiromastix major

Scientific classification
- Kingdom: Animalia
- Phylum: Arthropoda
- Subphylum: Chelicerata
- Class: Arachnida
- Order: Araneae
- Infraorder: Araneomorphae
- Family: Salticidae
- Subfamily: Salticinae
- Genus: Eustiromastix; Simon, 1902

Type species
- E. obscurus (Peckham & Peckham, 1894)

Species
- 14, see text

Synonyms
- Cybele Peckham & Peckham, 1894

= Eustiromastix =

Genus of spiders

Eustiromastix is a genus of jumping spiders that was first described by Eugène Louis Simon in 1902.

== Species ==
As of June 2019 it contains fourteen species, found in South America, on Saint Vincent and the Grenadines, Trinidad and Tobago, and in Panama:

- Eustiromastix bahiensis Galiano, 1979 – Brazil
- Eustiromastix efferatus Bauab & Soares, 1978 – Brazil
- Eustiromastix falcatus Galiano, 1981 – Trinidad, French Guiana, Brazil
- Eustiromastix frontalis (Banks, 1929) – Panama
- Eustiromastix guianae Caporiacco, 1954 – French Guiana
- Eustiromastix intermedius Galiano, 1979 – Venezuela
- Eustiromastix keyserlingi (Taczanowski, 1878) – Peru
- Eustiromastix macropalpus Galiano, 1979 – Brazil
- Eustiromastix major Simon, 1902 – French Guiana, Brazil
- Eustiromastix moraballi Mello-Leitão, 1940 – Venezuela, Guyana
- Eustiromastix nativo Santos & Romero, 2004 – Brazil
- Eustiromastix obscurus (Peckham & Peckham, 1894) (type) – St. Vincent
- Eustiromastix spinipes (Taczanowski, 1871) – Peru to Guyana
- Eustiromastix vincenti (Peckham & Peckham, 1894) – St. Vincent
