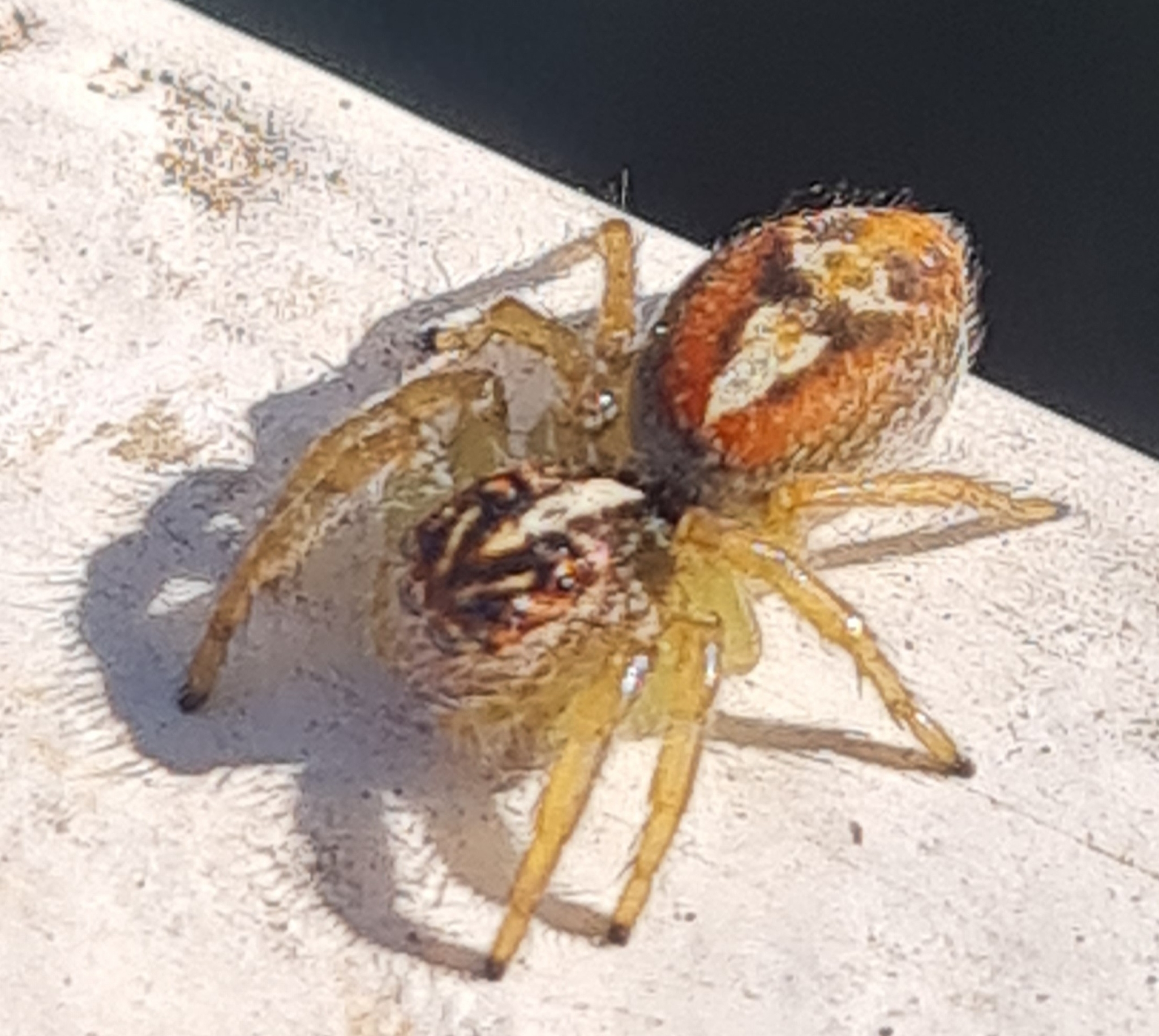
- female from Brazil
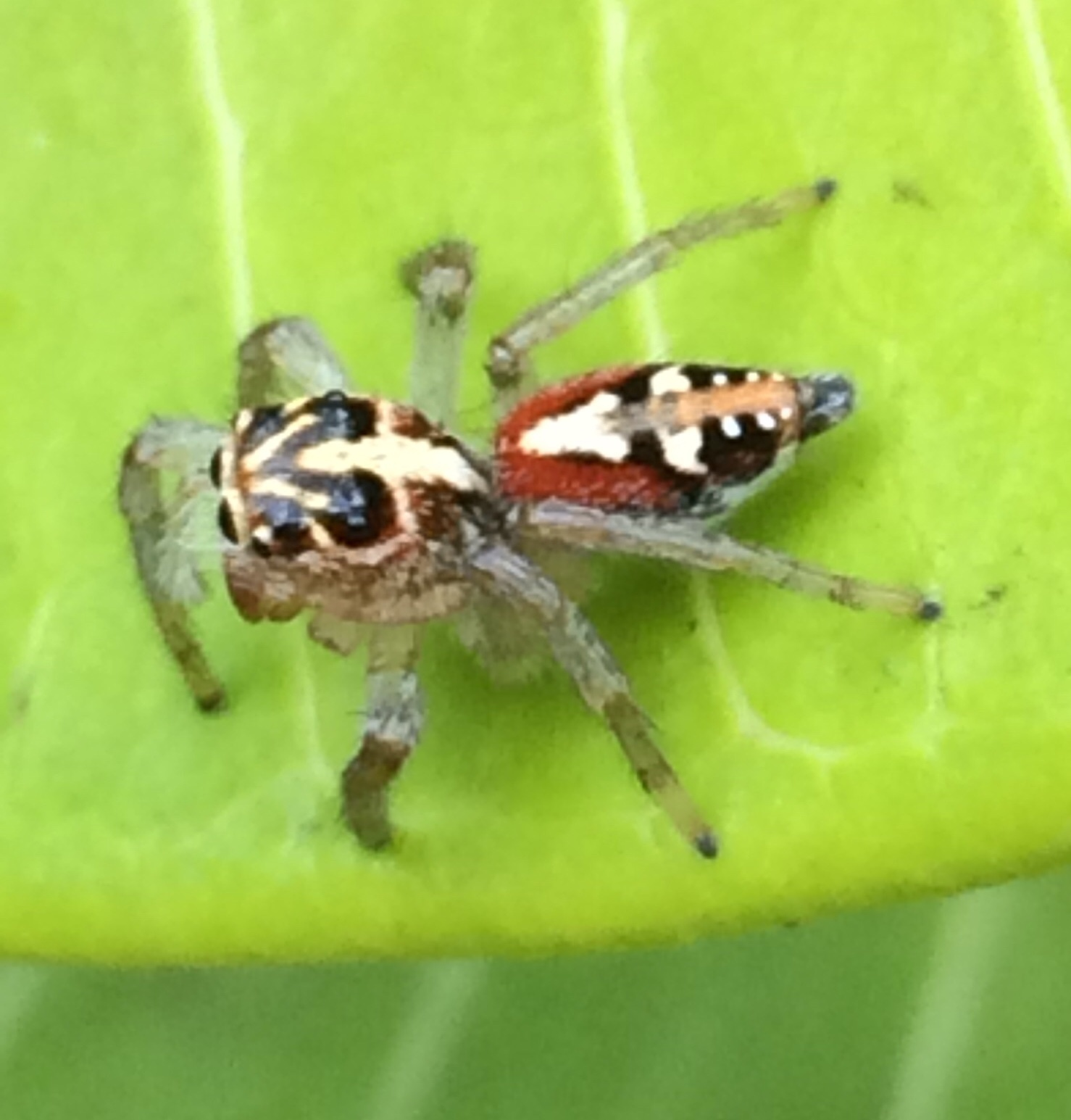
- juvenile from Brazil

Scientific classification
- Kingdom: Animalia
- Phylum: Arthropoda
- Subphylum: Chelicerata
- Class: Arachnida
- Order: Araneae
- Infraorder: Araneomorphae
- Family: Salticidae
- Genus: Frigga
- Species: F. quintensis

Binomial name
- Frigga quintensis (Tullgren, 1905)

Synonyms
- Phiale quintensis Tullgren, 1905; Phiale cardinalis Mello-Leitão, 1945

= Frigga quintensis =

Species of spider

Frigga quintensis is a species of jumping spider in the genus Frigga. It is found in Brazil, Paraguay, and Argentina.

== Taxonomy ==
The species was originally described by Albert Tullgren in 1905 as Phiale quintensis based on a male specimen from Quinta, Jujuy Province, Argentina. In 1945, Cândido Firmino de Mello-Leitão described what he believed to be a separate species, Phiale cardinalis, from material collected in Argentina.

In 1979, María Elena Galiano conducted a comprehensive revision of the genus Frigga and transferred the species from Phiale to Frigga, while also synonymizing P. cardinalis with F. quintensis. The holotype is deposited in the Museo de La Plata, Argentina.

== Distribution ==
F. quintensis is distributed across South America, with confirmed records from Brazil, Paraguay, and Argentina. In Argentina, it has been documented from the provinces of Jujuy, Salta, Formosa, Chaco, Santa Fe, Corrientes, and Misiones.

== Description ==
=== Male ===
The first described male of F. quintensis had a total length of approximately 8.5 mm, with the cephalothorax measuring 3.7 mm in length and 3.4 mm in width. The abdomen is 5 mm long and 2.8 mm wide. The legs follow the proportions 1, 4, 3, 2 (front legs longest), with the first leg being 13 mm long.

The cephalothorax is broadly oval with a distinctly depressed region between the second and third eye rows. The coloration is dark brown with broad white marginal bands on each side. The eye region is blackish with white and bright reddish hairs.

The abdomen is elongate, broadest in the middle and tapering toward the spinnerets. The back is brilliant red surrounded by a narrow black stripe, with white markings along the middle and distinctive spotted patterns.

=== Female ===
Females are similar in size to males, with the described female from 1979 having a total length of 8.38 mm. The front section (prosoma) measures 3.7 mm long and 3.0 mm wide. The eye region is 1.33 mm wide. Unlike males, the legs follow the proportions IV-III-I-II (fourth pair longest).

The reproductive structure (epigyne) has a deep, triangular depression with a very long central projection that extends more than halfway across the structure. The internal ducts are thick and straight.

In preserved specimens, females have a brownish-orange front section that is somewhat darker around the eyes, which are surrounded by large black spots. The abdomen shows distinctive patterning, and there is a wide black band on the underside. The legs are yellowish, with the front pair being more orange and slightly darker at the tips.
