= Tapsatella =

Scientific classification
- Kingdom: Animalia
- Phylum: Arthropoda
- Subphylum: Chelicerata
- Class: Arachnida
- Order: Araneae
- Infraorder: Araneomorphae
- Family: Salticidae
- Genus: Tapsatella; Rubio & Stolar, 2020
- Species: T. albocastanea

Binomial name
- Tapsatella albocastanea Rubio, Stolar & Nadal, 2020

Genus of jumping spiders

Tapsatella is a monotypic genus of South American jumping spiders containing the single species, Tapsatella albocastanea. It was placed in the tribe Aelurillini within the Salticoida clade of Salticinae. It was first described by G. D. Rubio, C. E. Stolar and M. F. Nadal in 2020, and is only known from Chaco Province, Argentina. It may be related to some species of Wedoquella and Phiale.

== See also ==
- List of Salticidae genera
