= Corcovetella =

Scientific classification
- Kingdom: Animalia
- Phylum: Arthropoda
- Subphylum: Chelicerata
- Class: Arachnida
- Order: Araneae
- Infraorder: Araneomorphae
- Family: Salticidae
- Subfamily: Salticinae
- Genus: Corcovetella; Galiano, 1975

Genus of spiders

Corcovetella is a genus of Brazilian jumping spiders (family Salticidae), first described by María Elena Galiano in 1975. Species are found in Brazil, Costa Rica and French Guiana.

As of July 2025, the World Spider Catalog accepted two species:

- Corcovetella aemulatrix Galiano, 1975 – Brazil, French Guiana
- Corcovetella galianoae Pekár, 2022 – Costa
