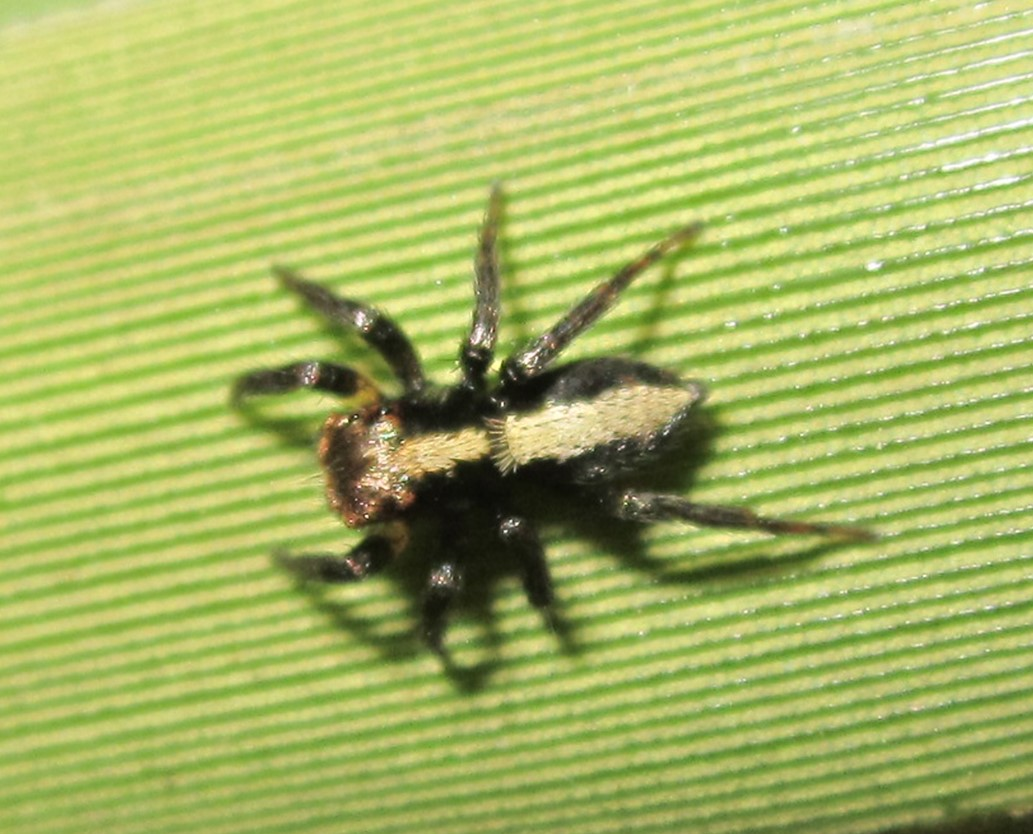
- Saphrys rusticana

Scientific classification
- Kingdom: Animalia
- Phylum: Arthropoda
- Subphylum: Chelicerata
- Class: Arachnida
- Order: Araneae
- Infraorder: Araneomorphae
- Family: Salticidae
- Subfamily: Salticinae
- Genus: Saphrys; Zhang & Maddison

Type species
- Saphrys tehuelche

Species
- See text

Diversity
- 9 species

= Saphrys =

Genus of spiders

Saphrys is a genus of spiders in the family Salticidae. It was first described in 2015 by Zhang & Maddison. As of 2017, it contains 9 species.

== Species ==
As of July 2017, the World Spider Catalog accepts the following species in the genus Saphrys:

- Saphrys a-notata (Mello-Leitão, 1940) – Argentina, Chile
- Saphrys flordellago (Richardson, 2010) – Brazil, Chile
- Saphrys laetata (Simon, 1904) – Chile
- Saphrys mapuche (Galiano, 1968) – Chile
- Saphrys patagonica (Simon, 1905) – Chile, Argentina
- Saphrys rapida (C. L. Koch, 1846) – Chile
- Saphrys rusticana (Nicolet, 1849) – Chile
- Saphrys saitiformis (Simon, 1901) – Chile, Argentina
- Saphrys tehuelche (Galiano, 1968) – Chile
