= Frigga =

Frigga may refer to:

- An anglicized form of the Old Norse goddess name Frigg
- Frigga (character), a fictional Marvel Comics character based on the Norse goddess - where some aspects of character history vary in the adapted versions of the character in Marvel Cinematic Universe
- Frigga (spider), a genus of jumping spiders, named after the Norse goddess.
- 77 Frigga, an asteroid
- A music project by artist Sasha Siem
