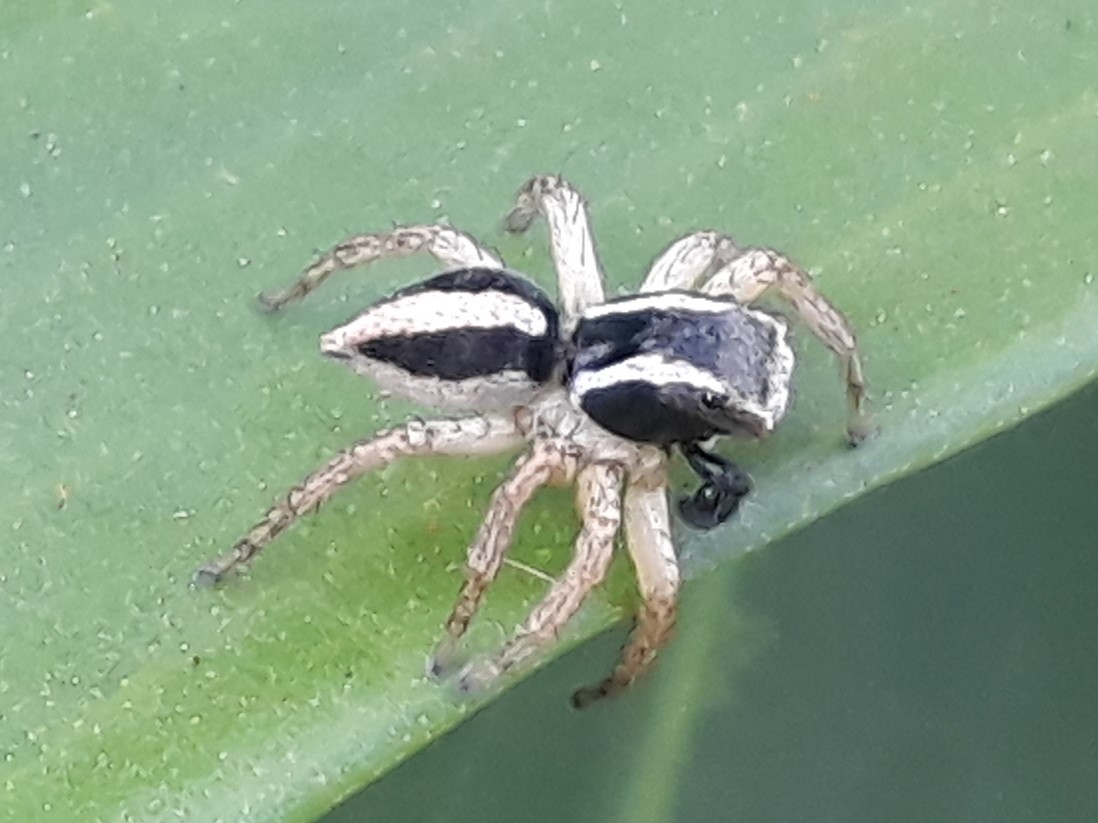
- Aphirape misionensis

Scientific classification
- Kingdom: Animalia
- Phylum: Arthropoda
- Subphylum: Chelicerata
- Class: Arachnida
- Order: Araneae
- Infraorder: Araneomorphae
- Family: Salticidae
- Subfamily: Salticinae
- Genus: Aphirape; C. L. Koch, 1850

Type species
- A. ancilla (C. L. Koch, 1846)

Species
- 8, see text

= Aphirape =

Genus of spiders

Aphirape is a genus of South American jumping spiders that was first described by Carl Ludwig Koch in 1850.

== Species ==
As of June 2019 it contains eight species, found in Uruguay, Argentina, Bolivia, and Brazil:

- Aphirape ancilla (C. L. Koch, 1846) (type) – Brazil
- Aphirape boliviensis Galiano, 1981 – Bolivia, Argentina
- Aphirape flexa Galiano, 1981 – Argentina, Uruguay
- Aphirape gamas Galiano, 1996 – Brazil, Argentina
- Aphirape misionensis Galiano, 1981 – Argentina, Brazil
- Aphirape riojana (Mello-Leitão, 1941) – Argentina
- Aphirape riparia Galiano, 1981 – Argentina
- Aphirape uncifera (Tullgren, 1905) – Argentina
