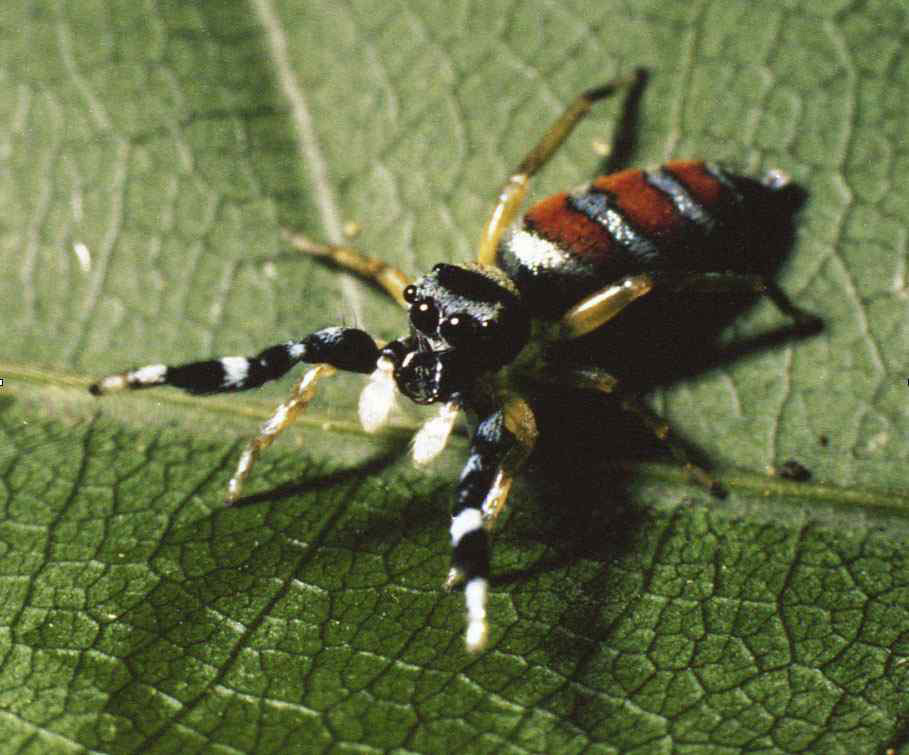
- Immature male Psecas euoplus

Scientific classification
- Kingdom: Animalia
- Phylum: Arthropoda
- Subphylum: Chelicerata
- Class: Arachnida
- Order: Araneae
- Infraorder: Araneomorphae
- Family: Salticidae
- Subfamily: Salticinae
- Genus: Psecas; C. L. Koch, 1850

Type species
- P. cyaneus (C. L. Koch, 1846)

Species
- 14, see text

= Psecas =

Genus of spiders

Psecas is a genus of jumping spiders that was first described by Carl Ludwig Koch in 1850.

== Species ==
As of August 2019 it contains fourteen species, found only in South America, Panama, and on Trinidad:

- Psecas bacelarae Caporiacco, 1947 – Guyana
- Psecas barbaricus (Peckham & Peckham, 1894) – Trinidad
- Psecas bubo (Taczanowski, 1871) – Guyana
- Psecas chapoda (Peckham & Peckham, 1894) – Brazil
- Psecas chrysogrammus (Simon, 1901) – Peru, Brazil
- Psecas cyaneus (C. L. Koch, 1846) (type) – Suriname
- Psecas euoplus Chamberlin & Ivie, 1936 – Panama
- Psecas jaguatirica Mello-Leitão, 1941 – Colombia
- Psecas pulcher Badcock, 1932 – Paraguay
- Psecas rubrostriatus Schmidt, 1956 – Colombia
- Psecas sumptuosus (Perty, 1833) – Panama to Argentina
- Psecas vellutinus Mello-Leitão, 1948 – Guyana
- Psecas viridipurpureus (Simon, 1901) – Brazil
- Psecas zonatus Galiano, 1963 – Brazil
