= Udalmella =

Scientific classification
- Kingdom: Animalia
- Phylum: Arthropoda
- Subphylum: Chelicerata
- Class: Arachnida
- Order: Araneae
- Infraorder: Araneomorphae
- Family: Salticidae
- Genus: Udalmella; Galiano, 1994
- Species: U. gamboa

Binomial name
- Udalmella gamboa Galiano, 1994

Genus of spiders

Udalmella is a monotypic genus of Panamanian jumping spiders containing the single species, Udalmella gamboa. It was first described by María Elena Galiano in 1994, and is found in Panama.
