= Hyetussa longithorax =

Scientific classification
- Kingdom: Animalia
- Phylum: Arthropoda
- Subphylum: Chelicerata
- Class: Arachnida
- Order: Araneae
- Infraorder: Araneomorphae
- Family: Salticidae
- Genus: Hyetussa
- Species: H. longithorax

Binomial name
- Hyetussa longithorax (Petrunkevitch, 1925)

Synonyms
- Mica longithorax Petrunkevitch, 1925; Micalula longithorax Strand, 1932 (generic replacement name)

Species of spider

Hyetussa longithorax is a species of spider in the jumping spider family Salticidae, found in Panama.
