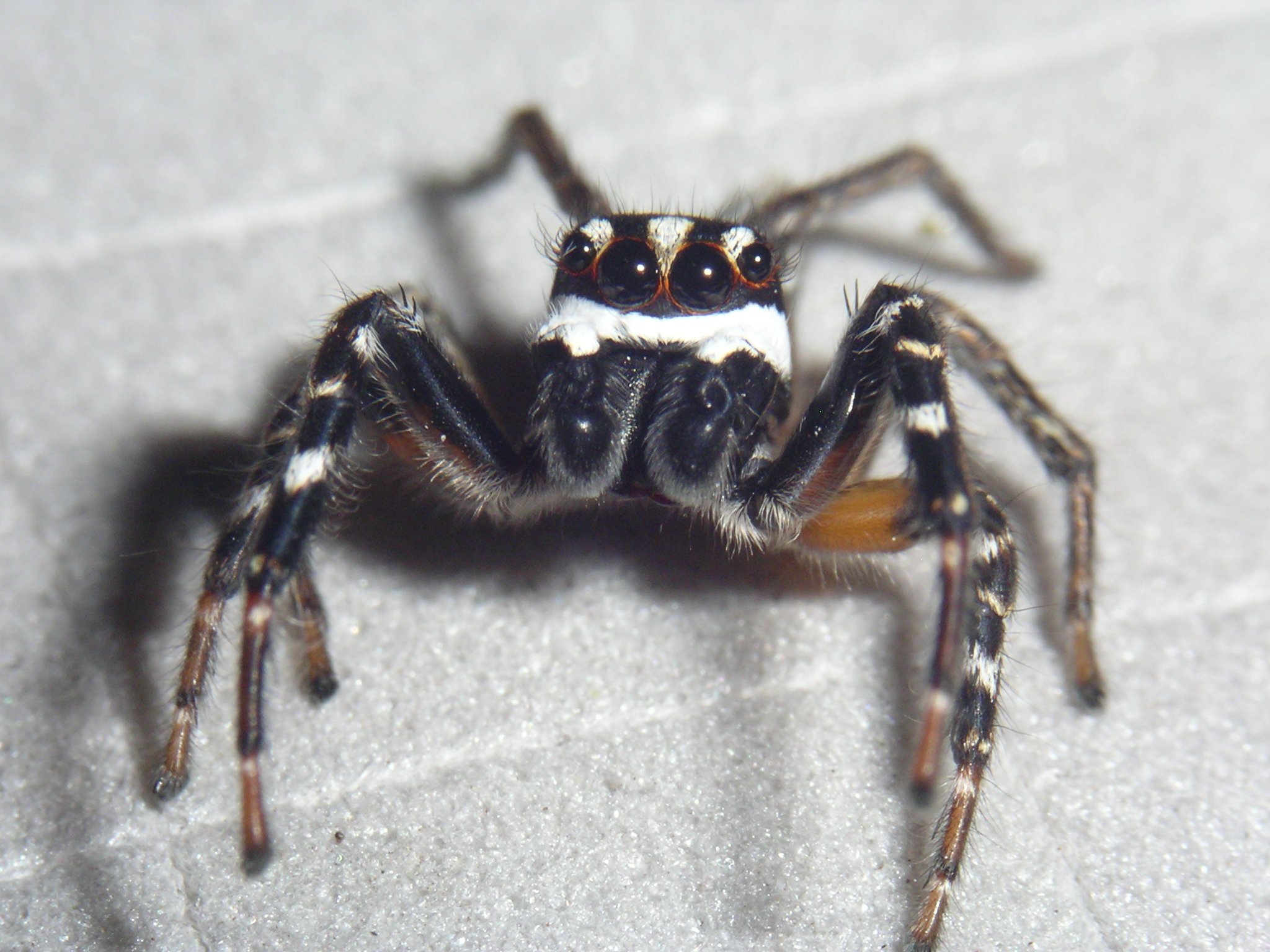
- Male Freya decorata in Ecuador

Scientific classification
- Kingdom: Animalia
- Phylum: Arthropoda
- Subphylum: Chelicerata
- Class: Arachnida
- Order: Araneae
- Infraorder: Araneomorphae
- Family: Salticidae
- Subfamily: Salticinae
- Genus: Freya; C. L. Koch, 1850

Type species
- F. decorata (C. L. Koch, 1846)

Species
- 13, see text

= Freya (spider) =

Genus of spiders

Freya is a genus of jumping spiders that was first described by Carl Ludwig Koch in 1850. The name is derived from Freya, the fertility goddess of Norse mythology.

== Species ==
As of June 2019 it contains thirteen species, found in South America, Guatemala, Mexico, and Panama:

- Freya atures Galiano, 2001 – Venezuela
- Freya bicavata (F. O. Pickard-Cambridge, 1901) – Panama
- Freya chapare Galiano, 2001 – Bolivia, Brazil
- Freya decorata (C. L. Koch, 1846) (type) – Northern South America
- Freya disparipes Caporiacco, 1954 – French Guiana
- Freya dureti Galiano, 2001 – Brazil
- Freya justina Banks, 1929 – Panama
- Freya nigrotaeniata (Mello-Leitão, 1945) – Paraguay, Argentina
- Freya petrunkevitchi Chickering, 1946 – Panama
- Freya prominens (F. O. Pickard-Cambridge, 1901) – Mexico to Panama
- Freya regia (Peckham & Peckham, 1896) – Mexico, Guatemala
- Freya rubiginosa (C. L. Koch, 1846) – Brazil
- Freya rufohirta (Simon, 1902) – Brazil
