= Saphrys tehuelche =

Scientific classification
- Kingdom: Animalia
- Phylum: Arthropoda
- Subphylum: Chelicerata
- Class: Arachnida
- Order: Araneae
- Infraorder: Araneomorphae
- Family: Salticidae
- Genus: Saphrys
- Species: S. tehuelche

Binomial name
- Saphrys tehuelche (Galiano, 1968)

Species of spider

Saphrys tehuelche is a species of jumping spider (family Salticidae). The species was classified in the genus Euophrys from 1968, when it was first described by María Elena Galiano, until 2015. It can be found in Chile.
