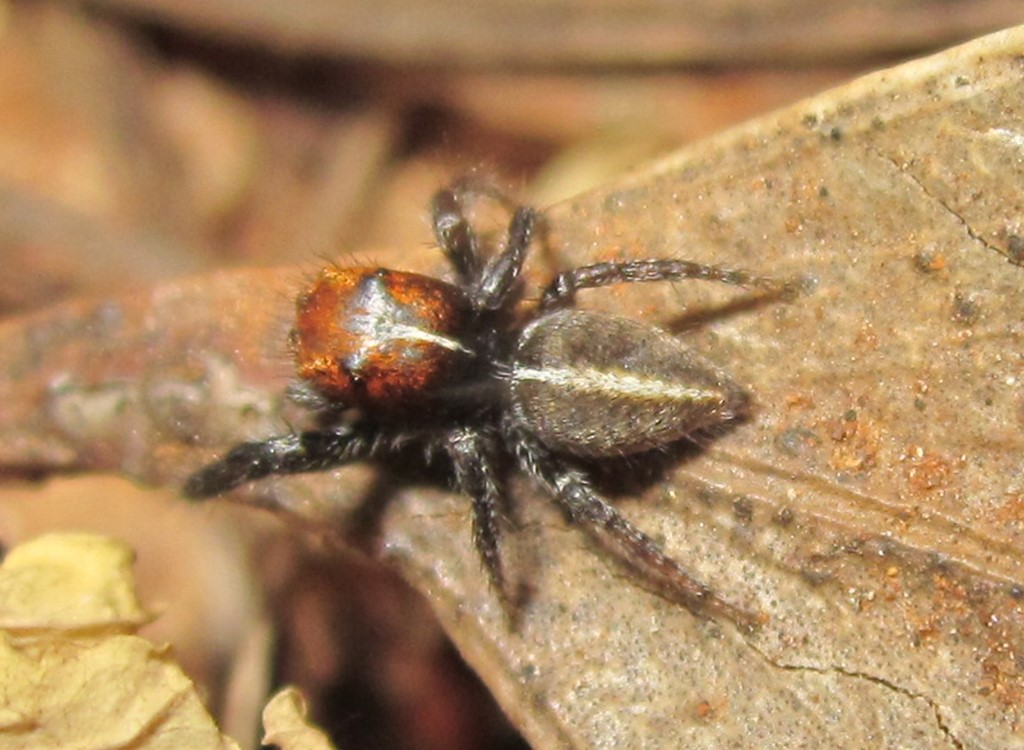
- Trydarssus nobilitatus

Scientific classification
- Kingdom: Animalia
- Phylum: Arthropoda
- Subphylum: Chelicerata
- Class: Arachnida
- Order: Araneae
- Infraorder: Araneomorphae
- Family: Salticidae
- Subfamily: Salticinae
- Genus: Trydarssus; Galiano, 1995

Type species
- T. pantherinus (Mello-Leitão, 1946)

Species
- T. nobilitatus (Nicolet, 1849) – Chile; T. pantherinus (Mello-Leitão, 1946) – Paraguay, Argentina

= Trydarssus =

Genus of spiders

Trydarssus is a genus of South American jumping spiders that was first described by María Elena Galiano in 1995. As of August 2019 it contains only two species that are found in Argentina, Paraguay, and Chile: T. nobilitatus and T. pantherinus.
