= Simonurius =

Scientific classification
- Kingdom: Animalia
- Phylum: Arthropoda
- Subphylum: Chelicerata
- Class: Arachnida
- Order: Araneae
- Infraorder: Araneomorphae
- Family: Salticidae
- Subfamily: Salticinae
- Genus: Simonurius; Galiano, 1988

Type species
- S. gladifer (Simon, 1901)

Species
- 4, see text

Genus of spiders

Simonurius is a genus of South American jumping spiders that was first described by María Elena Galiano in 1988. The name is a reference to arachnologist Eugène Simon.

== Species ==
As of April 2022 it contains four species, found in South America:

- Simonurius expers Galiano, 1988 – Argentina
- Simonurius gladifer (Simon, 1901) (type) – Brazil, Argentina
- Simonurius pisac (Galiano, 1985) – Peru
- Simonurius quadratarius (Simon, 1901) – Colombia, Venezuela
