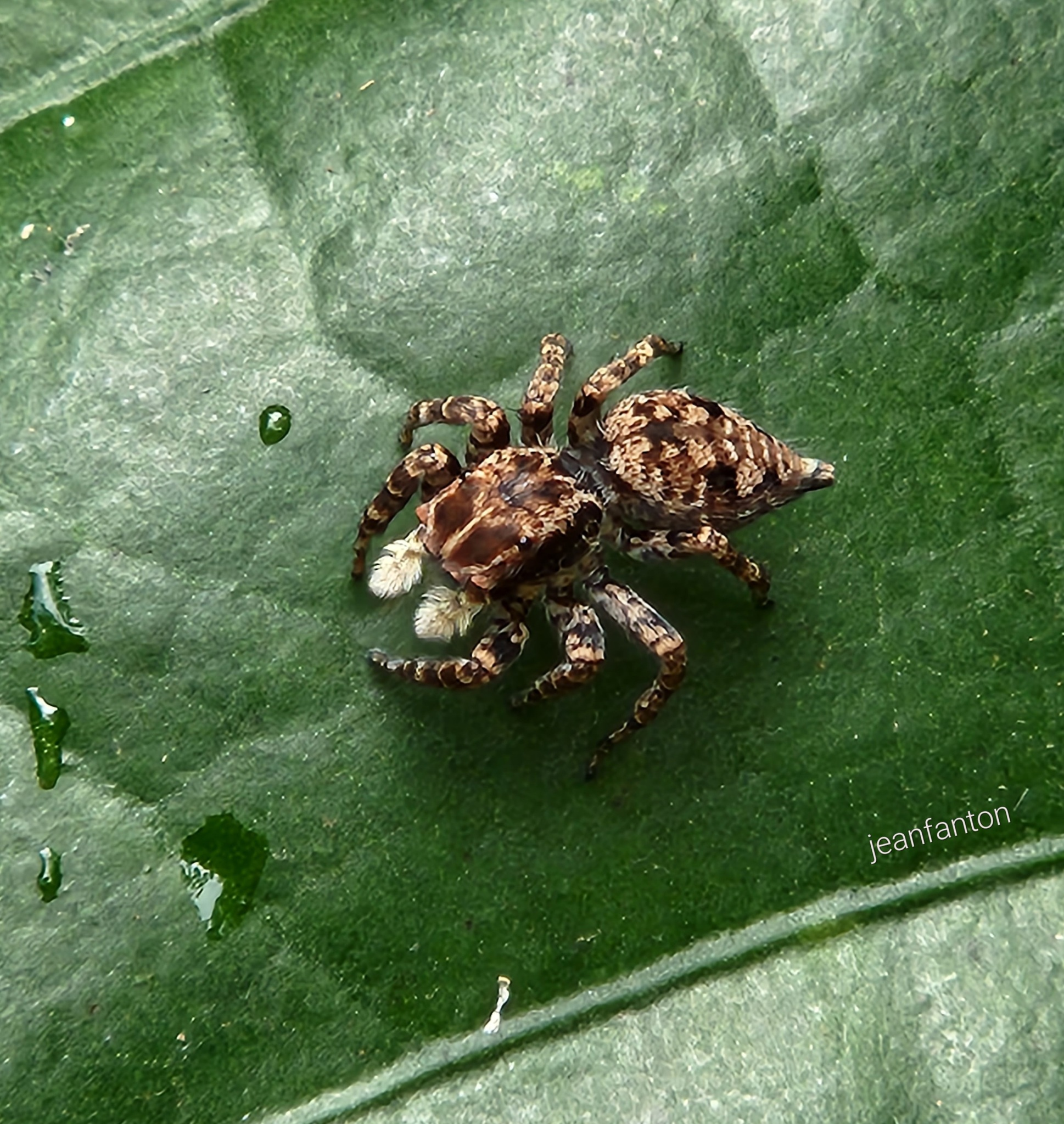
- female S. quinquefasciatus from Brazil
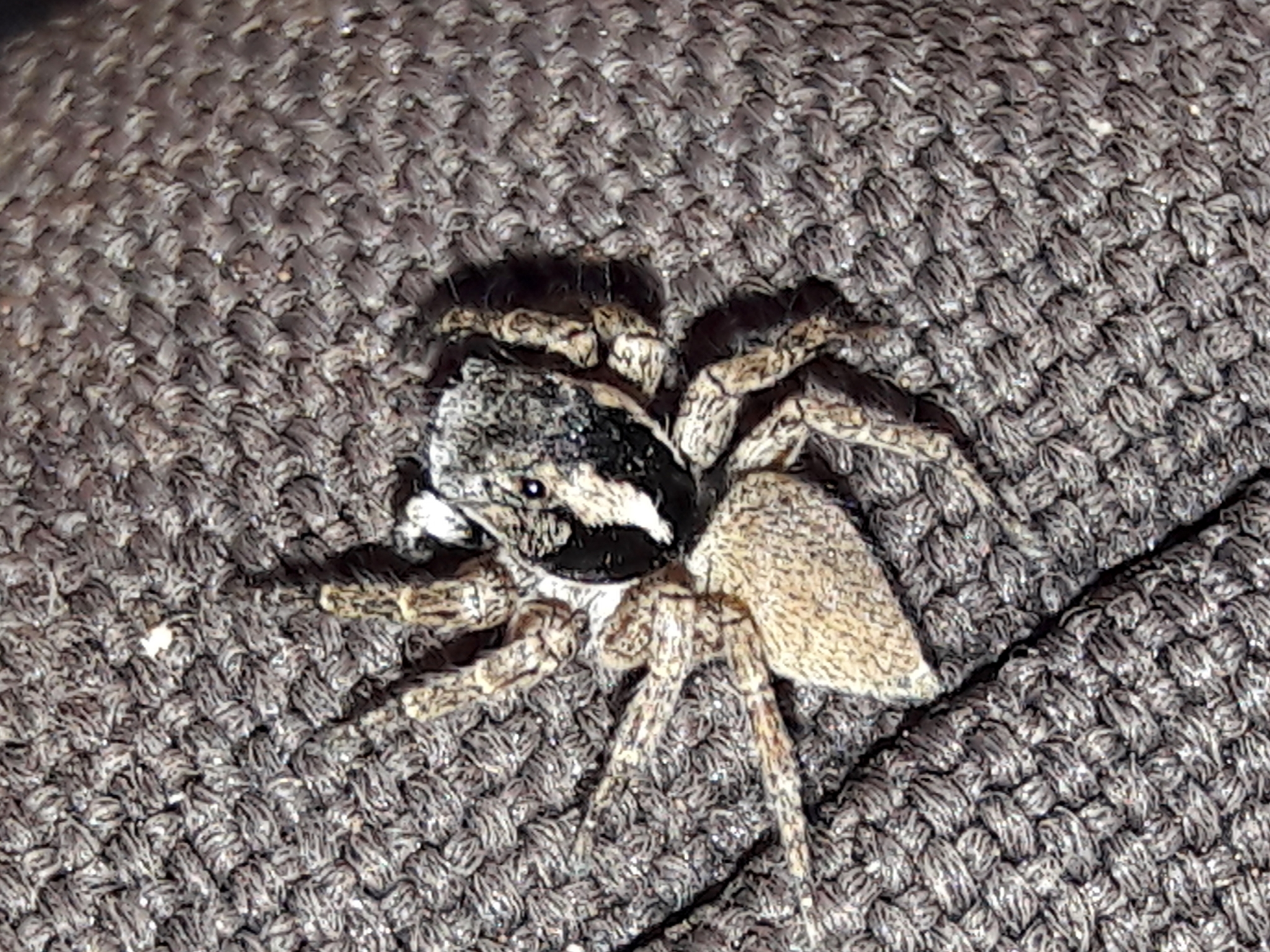
- male S. quinquefasciatus from Brazil

Scientific classification
- Kingdom: Animalia
- Phylum: Arthropoda
- Subphylum: Chelicerata
- Class: Arachnida
- Order: Araneae
- Infraorder: Araneomorphae
- Family: Salticidae
- Subfamily: Salticinae
- Genus: Sumampattus; Galiano, 1983

Type species
- S. pantherinus (Mello-Leitão, 1942)

Species
- S. hudsoni Galiano, 1996 – Paraguay, Uruguay, Argentina; S. pantherinus (Mello-Leitão, 1942) – Argentina; S. quinqueradiatus (Taczanowski, 1878) – Peru, Brazil, Paraguay, Argentina

= Sumampattus =

Genus of spiders

Sumampattus is a genus of South American jumping spiders that was first described by María Elena Galiano in 1983.

The name is a combination of Sumampa, a Department of Argentina, and the common ending for salticid genera -attus.

As of August 2025 it contains four described species:

- S. hudsoni Galiano, 1996 - Paraguay, Uruguay, Argentina
- S. pantherinus (Mello-Leitão, 1942) - Argentina
- S. quinqueradiatus (Taczanowski, 1878) - Peru, Brazil, Paraguay, Argentina
- Sumampattus verae Marta, Figueiredo & Rodrigues, 2023 - Brazil
