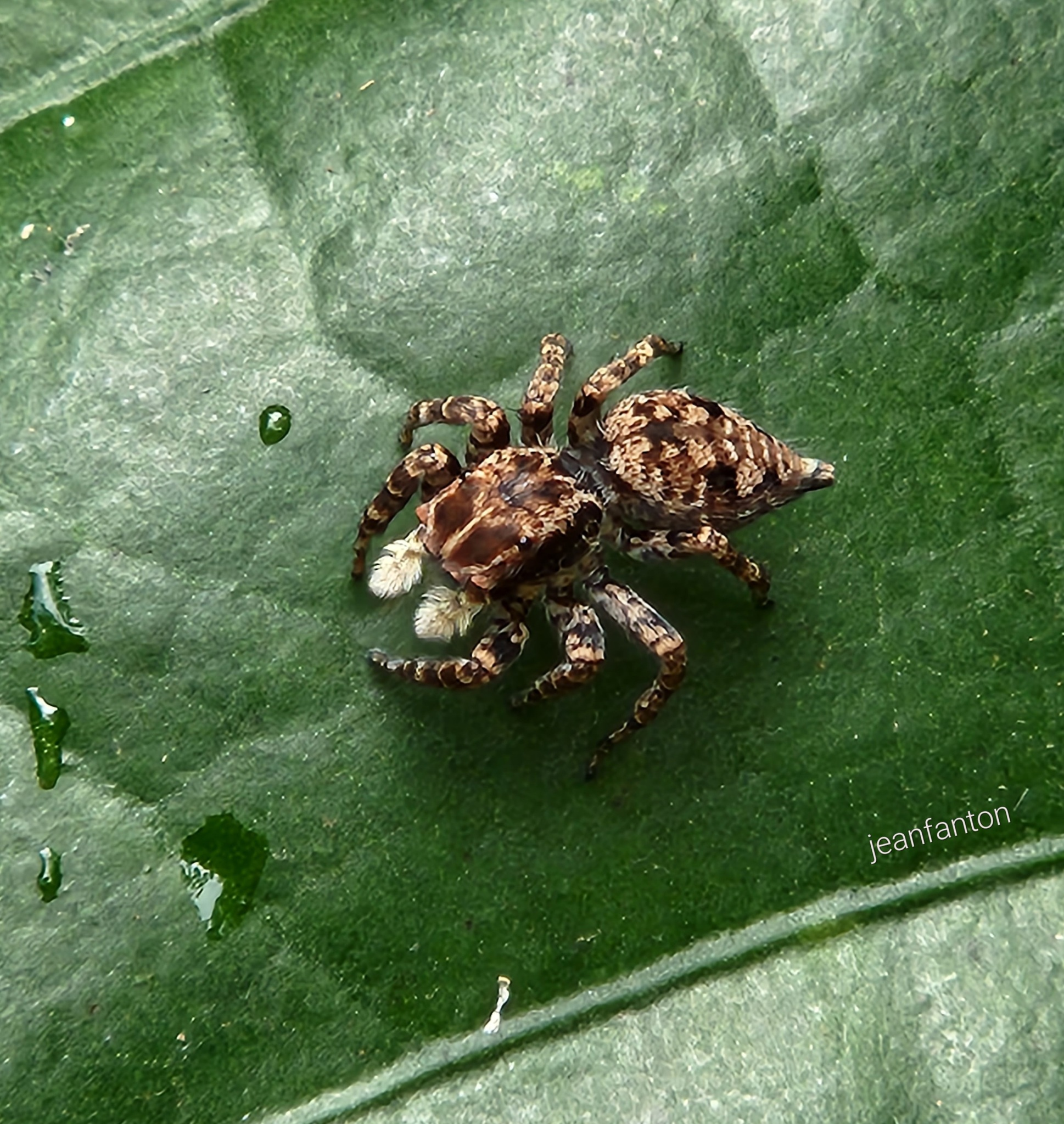
- female from Brazil
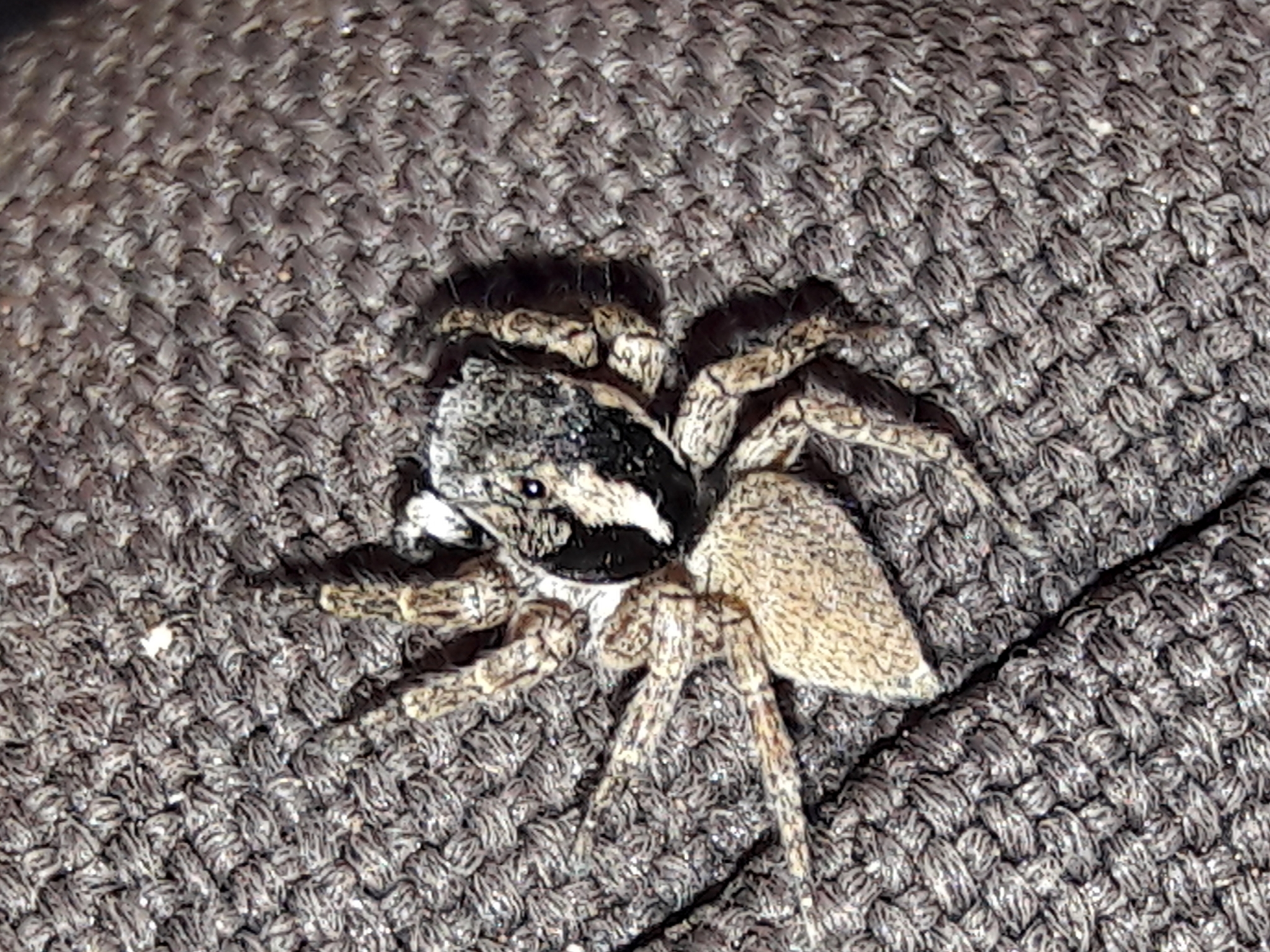
- male from Brazil

Scientific classification
- Kingdom: Animalia
- Phylum: Arthropoda
- Subphylum: Chelicerata
- Class: Arachnida
- Order: Araneae
- Infraorder: Araneomorphae
- Family: Salticidae
- Genus: Sumampattus
- Species: S. quinqueradiatus

Binomial name
- Sumampattus quinqueradiatus (Taczanowski, 1878)

Synonyms
- Euophrys quinqueradiatus Taczanowski, 1878

= Sumampattus quinqueradiatus =

Species of spider

Sumampattus quinqueradiatus is a species of jumping spider of the genus Sumampattus. It is found in Peru, Brazil, Paraguay, and Argentina.

The species name meaning "five-banded" refers to the five white bands seen from the front in the female.

== Taxonomy ==
The species was originally described as Euophrys quinqueradiatus by Władysław Taczanowski in 1878 based on female specimens from Peru. It was later transferred to the genus Sumampattus by María Elena Galiano in 1983, who also provided the first description of the male.

== Distribution ==
S. quinqueradiatus is found across South America, with confirmed records from Peru (Junín Department), Brazil (Bahia and Mato Grosso), Paraguay (Amambay Department), and Argentina (Salta, Jujuy, and Misiones Province).

== Description ==
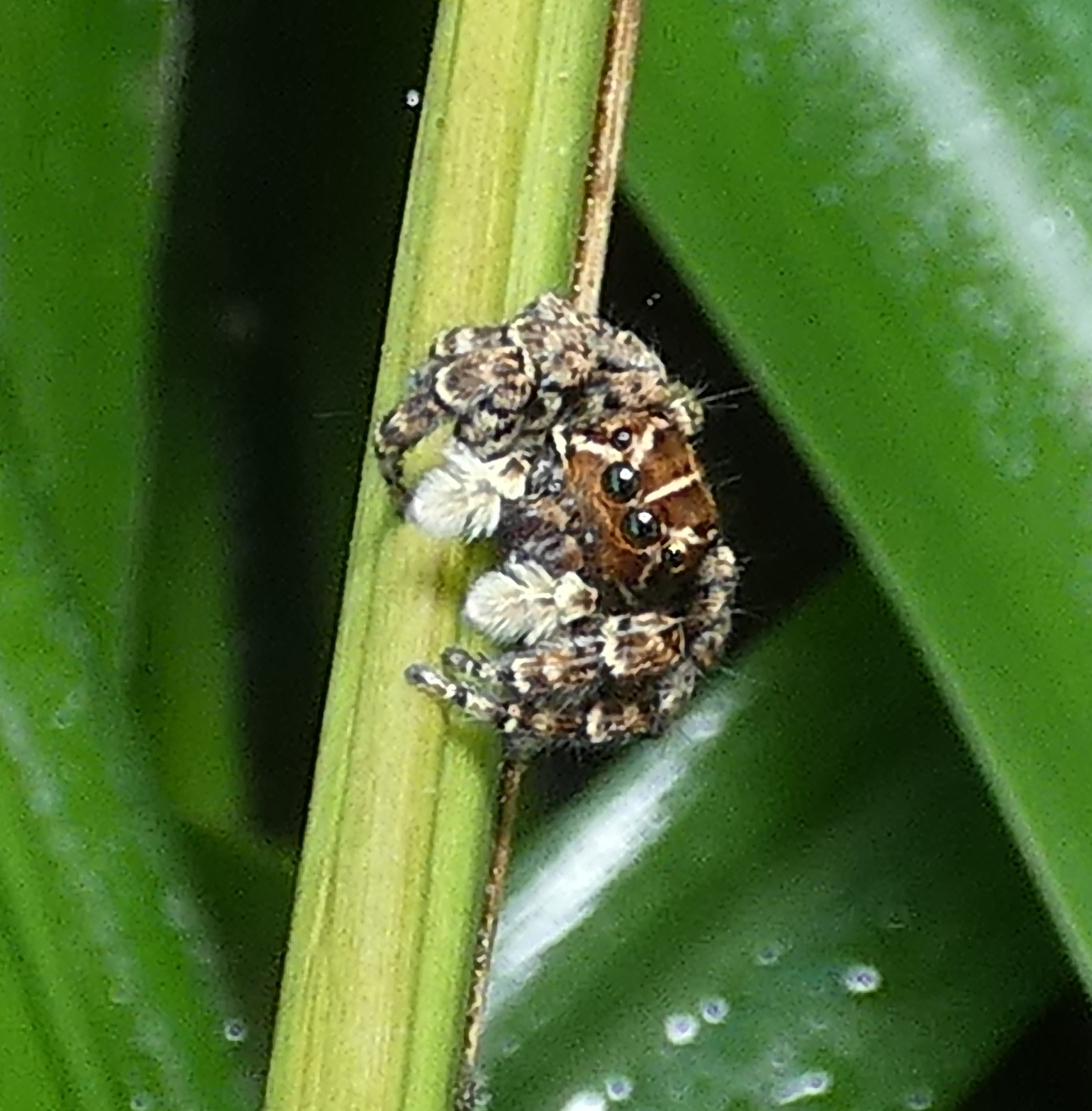
front view of female, showing the five bands

S. quinqueradiatus is a medium-sized jumping spider. Females measure approximately 6.0 mm in total length, while males are slightly smaller at about 5.4 mm.

The species displays distinctive coloration patterns. Females have a dark brown cephalothorax with a blackish head region covered in reddish-brown hairs. The head features five characteristic white hair bands: one running longitudinally down the center, two on each side extending from the posterior lateral eyes, and one on each side visible in frontal view extending from between the anterior lateral and median eyes. The abdomen is brown with yellow markings forming an irregular median band bordered by brown and black hair patches.

Males are generally darker than females, with a very dark brown prosoma featuring reddish hairs on the head region. The thoracic region has two broad pale brown bands with white hairs. The abdomen follows the basic female pattern but is much darker, with brown patches instead of the yellow ones seen in females.

The legs are yellow with blackish rings and patches. In both sexes, the femur has a broad basal ring (incomplete on the dorsal side) and a complete apical ring, the patella has the distal half darkened, and the tibia has broad basal and apical rings.

== Habitat and behavior ==
Specimens collected in Iguazú National Park in Argentina were found during September and October in vegetation bordering paths in fairly open and sunny areas. Laboratory observations showed that females can produce multiple egg sacs, and the juveniles can be successfully reared to maturity.
