= Hisukattus =

Scientific classification
- Kingdom: Animalia
- Phylum: Arthropoda
- Subphylum: Chelicerata
- Class: Arachnida
- Order: Araneae
- Infraorder: Araneomorphae
- Family: Salticidae
- Subfamily: Salticinae
- Genus: Hisukattus; Galiano, 1987

Type species
- Hisukattus transversalis Galiano, 1987

Species
- See text.

Genus of spiders

Hisukattus is a genus of the spider family Salticidae (jumping spiders).

== Species ==
As of May 2017, the World Spider Catalog lists the following species in the genus:

- Hisukattus alienus Galiano, 1987 – Brazil
- Hisukattus simplex (Mello-Leitão, 1944) – Argentina
- Hisukattus transversalis Galiano, 1987 – Argentina, Paraguay
- Hisukattus tristis (Mello-Leitão, 1944) – Argentina
