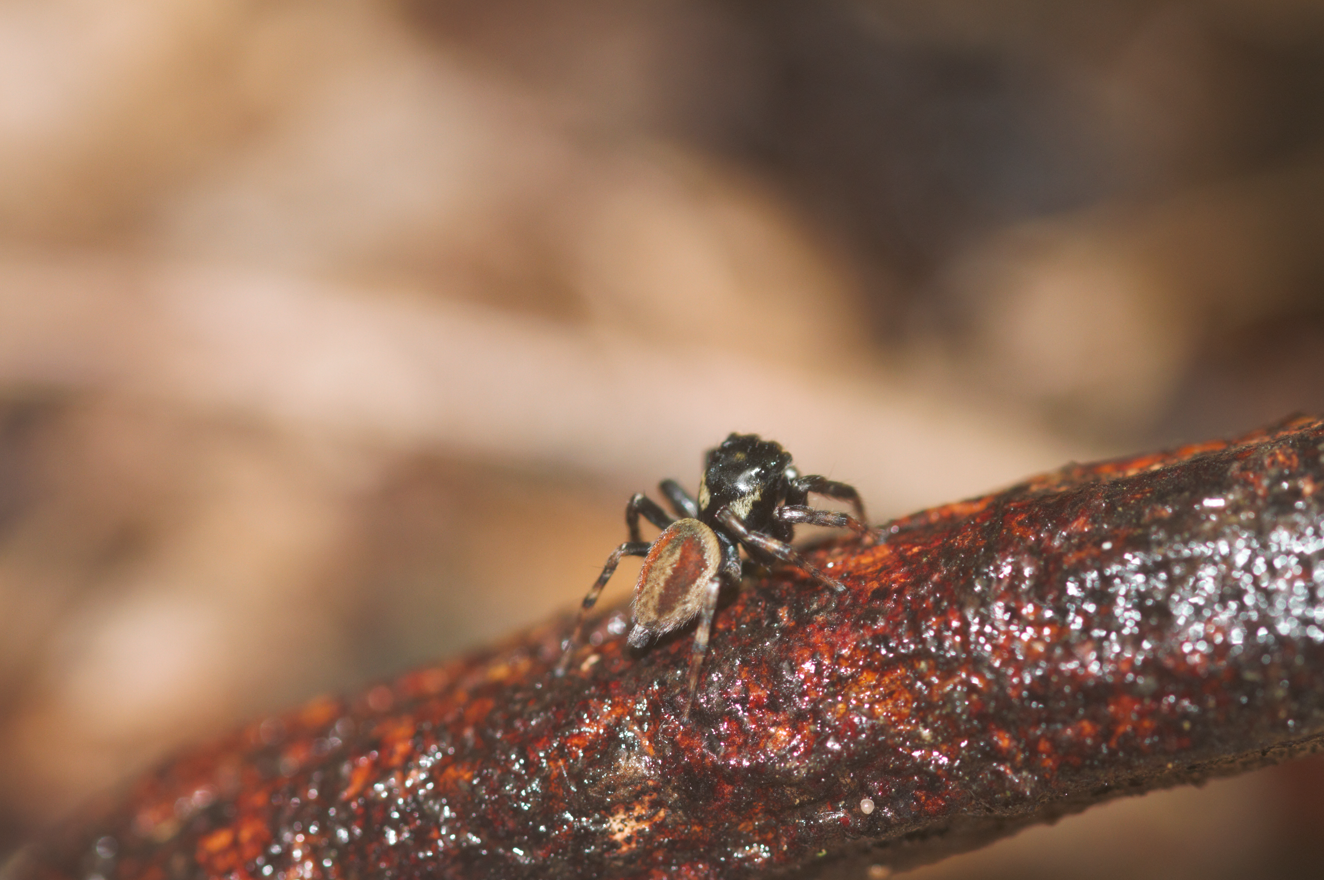
- male from French Guiana

Scientific classification
- Kingdom: Animalia
- Phylum: Arthropoda
- Subphylum: Chelicerata
- Class: Arachnida
- Order: Araneae
- Infraorder: Araneomorphae
- Family: Salticidae
- Subfamily: Salticinae
- Genus: Kalcerrytus; Galiano, 2000

Type species
- Kalcerrytus merretti Galiano, 2000

Species
- See text.

= Kalcerrytus =

Genus of spiders

Kalcerrytus is a genus of spiders in the jumping spider family, Salticidae.

== Species ==
- Kalcerrytus amapari Galiano, 2000 (Brazil)
- Kalcerrytus amplexus Bustamante & Ruiz, 2016
- Kalcerrytus carvalhoi (Bauab & Soares, 1978) (Brazil)
- Kalcerrytus chimore Galiano, 2000 (Bolivia)
- Kalcerrytus edwardsi Ruiz & Brescovit, 2003 (Brazil)
- Kalcerrytus excultus (Simon, 1902) (Brazil)
- Kalcerrytus falcatus Ruiz & Brescovit, 2003 (Brazil)
- Kalcerrytus filipi Bustamante & Ruiz, 2016
- Kalcerrytus kikkri Galiano, 2000 (French Guiana)
- Kalcerrytus leonardi Bustamante & Ruiz, 2016
- Kalcerrytus leucodon (Taczanowski, 1878) (Ecuador)
- Kalcerrytus limoncocha Galiano, 2000 (Ecuador)
- Kalcerrytus mberuguarus Ruiz & Brescovit, 2003 (Brazil)
- Kalcerrytus merretti Galiano, 2000 (Brazil)
- Kalcerrytus nauticus Galiano, 2000 (Brazil)
- Kalcerrytus odontophorus Ruiz & Brescovit, 2003 (Brazil)
- Kalcerrytus rosamariae Ruiz & Brescovit, 2003 (Brazil)
- Kalcerrytus salsicha Ruiz & Brescovit, 2003 (Brazil)
