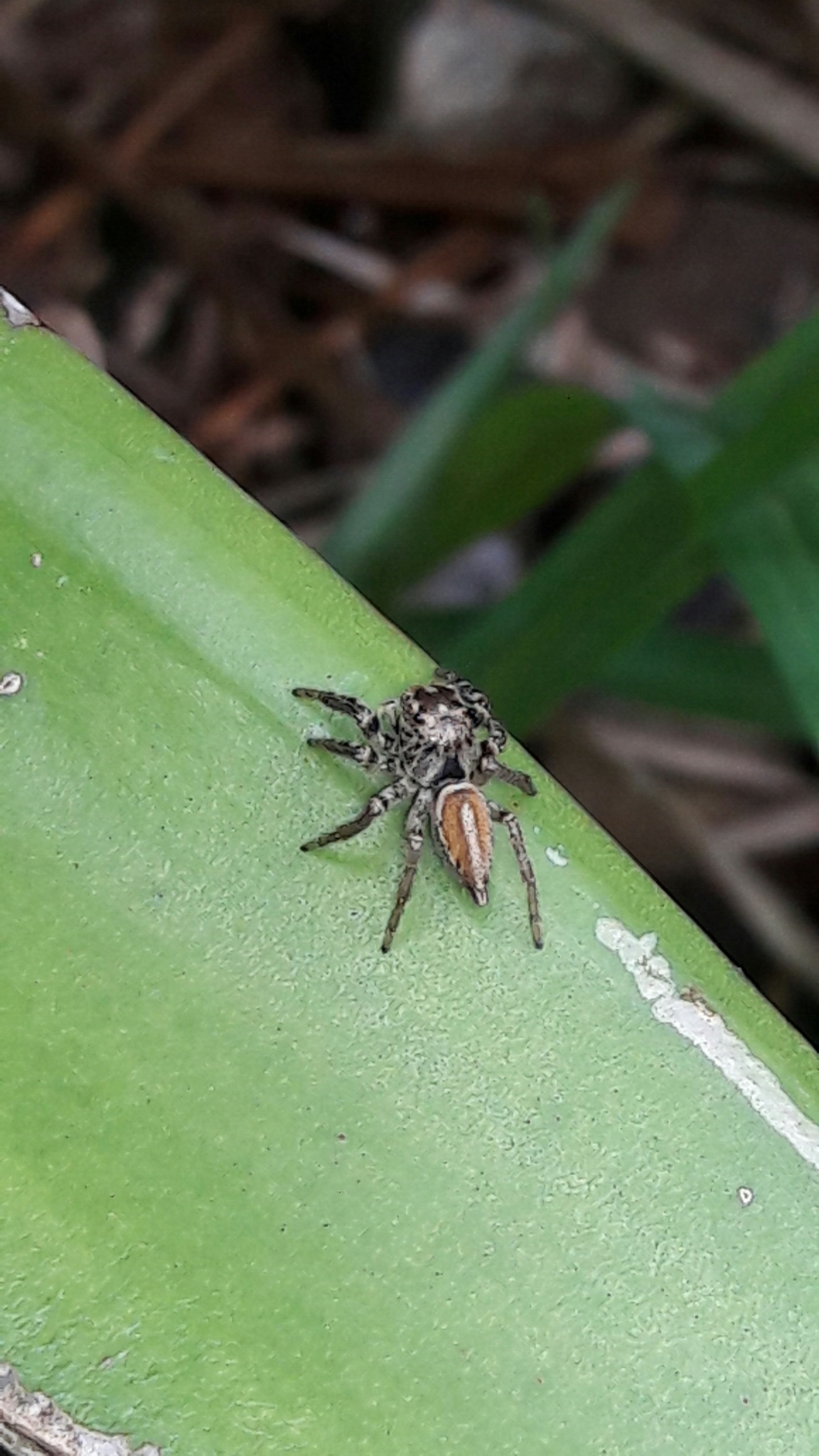
- female from Brazil
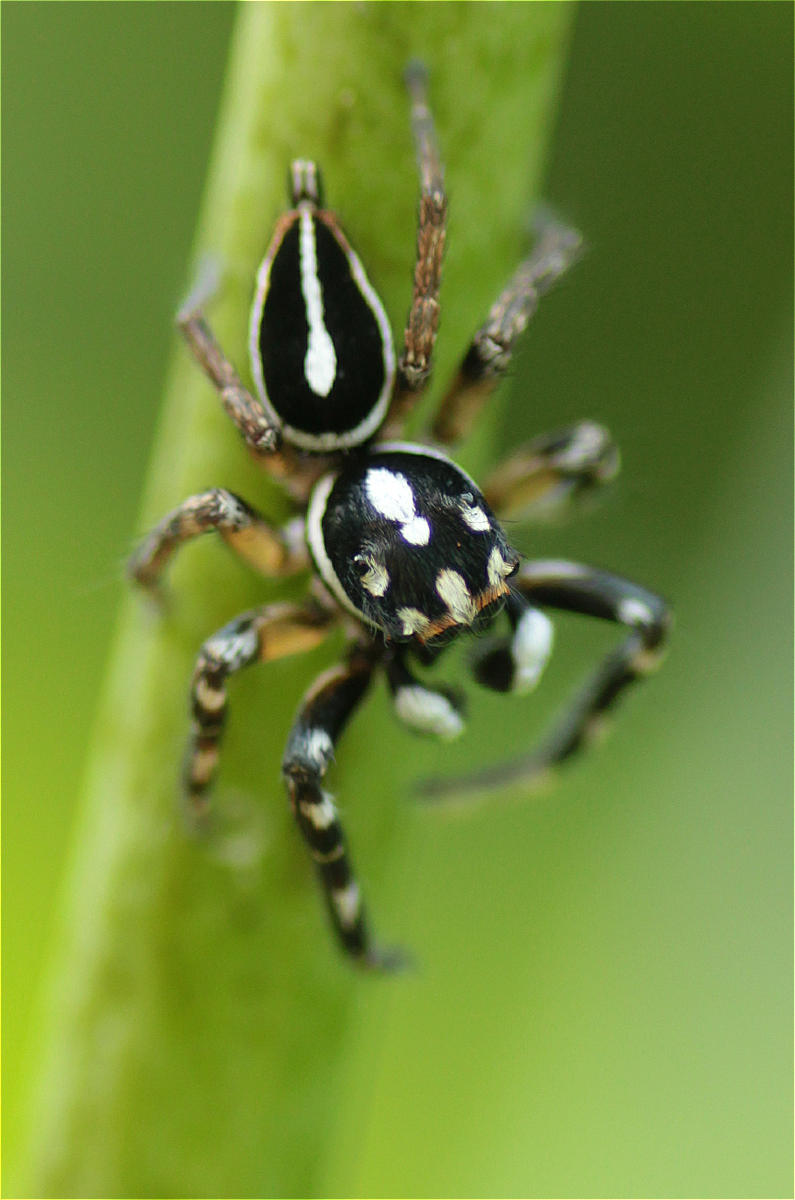
- male from Ecuador

Scientific classification
- Kingdom: Animalia
- Phylum: Arthropoda
- Subphylum: Chelicerata
- Class: Arachnida
- Order: Araneae
- Infraorder: Araneomorphae
- Family: Salticidae
- Genus: Freya
- Species: F. decorata

Binomial name
- Freya decorata (C. L. Koch, 1846)

Synonyms
- Euophrys decorata C. L. Koch, 1846; Euophrys trifasciata C. L. Koch, 1846; Attus brandtii Taczanowski, 1871; Attus decoratus Taczanowski, 1871; Euophrys decorata dyscrita Penther, 1900; Freya brandti (Taczanowski, 1871); Freya strandi Caporiacco, 1947; Freya dyali Roewer, 1951

= Freya decorata =

Species of spider

Freya decorata is a species of jumping spider in the genus Freya. It is the type species of its genus and is found in northern South America.

== Taxonomy ==
The species was first described by Carl Ludwig Koch in 1846 as Euophrys decorata, with the male illustrated in figure 1248 of his work. In the same publication, Koch described what he believed to be a separate species, Euophrys trifasciata (figure 1249), based on a female specimen from Brazil. However, Koch himself expressed uncertainty about whether E. trifasciata might actually be the female of E. decorata, noting in his description that "perhaps the spider described here is the female of Attus decoratus, but the differently formed cephalothorax and the lateral band extending over the edges raise not entirely unfounded doubts."

Modern taxonomic studies have confirmed that both names refer to the same species, representing the male and female forms respectively. Euophrys trifasciata was formally synonymized with Freya decorata by Eugène Simon in 1903. Both names are now considered junior synonyms of Freya decorata.

The species was transferred to the genus Freya by Koch himself in 1850. Freya decorata serves as the type species for the genus Freya, which was named after Freyja, the fertility goddess of Norse mythology.

== Distribution ==
F. decorata has been recorded from several countries in northern South America, including Brazil, Colombia, Ecuador, French Guiana, and Guyana.

== Description ==
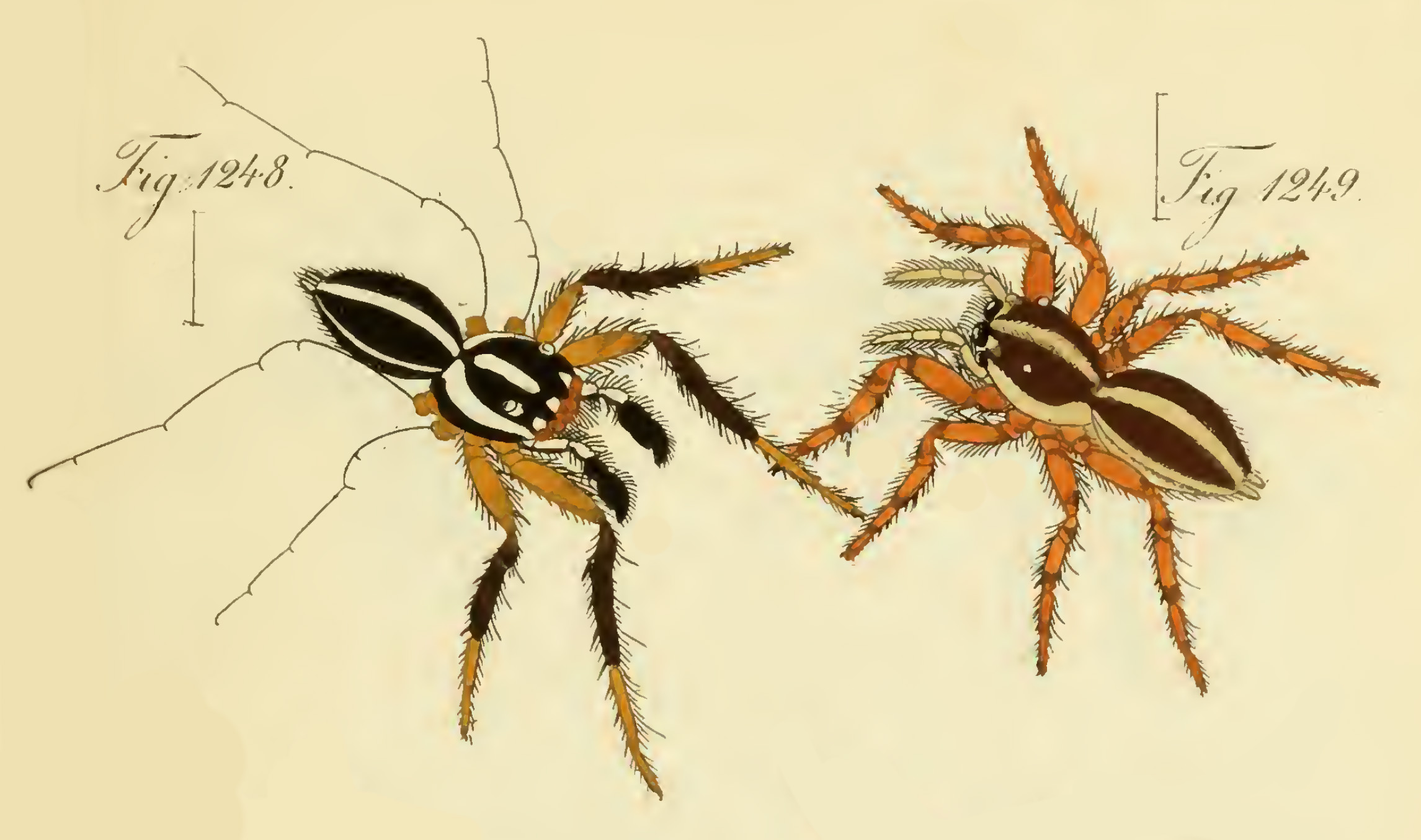
male and female from original description

Koch's original descriptions of the male and female reveal the sexual dimorphism that initially led him to consider them separate species.

=== Male ===
The male measures approximately 3.5 mm in length. The cephalothorax and abdomen are deep black, each with three longitudinal snow-white stripes. The lateral stripe on the cephalothorax does not reach the side edges, leaving fairly broad black margins. The legs are rust-yellow with brown rings and white spots.

The cephalothorax is of equal width and height, with the head region slightly arched toward the anterior eye row, and the eyes of this row looking somewhat obliquely downward. The chelicerae are fairly long, cone-shaped, and matte-glossy with very fine wrinkles above. The male palps have an upward-standing, curved, fairly long process on the genitalia. The abdomen is narrower than the cephalothorax and egg-shaped, with somewhat long, protruding spinnerets.

=== Female ===
The female is also approximately 3.5 mm long but differs noticeably in several features. While sharing the same basic coloration pattern of dark brown body with three yellowish-white longitudinal stripes, the female's cephalothorax has a different shape—the head is somewhat narrower, the thorax broader and more rounded at the side edges. Most significantly, the lateral band on the cephalothorax is twice as broad as in the male and covers the side edges completely, extending over the chelicerae at the front margin into longer, dense hairs of the same color.

The leg proportions also differ between sexes: in the female, the legs are somewhat short, with the fourth pair longest, the third somewhat longer than the first, and the second longest but almost as long as the first.
