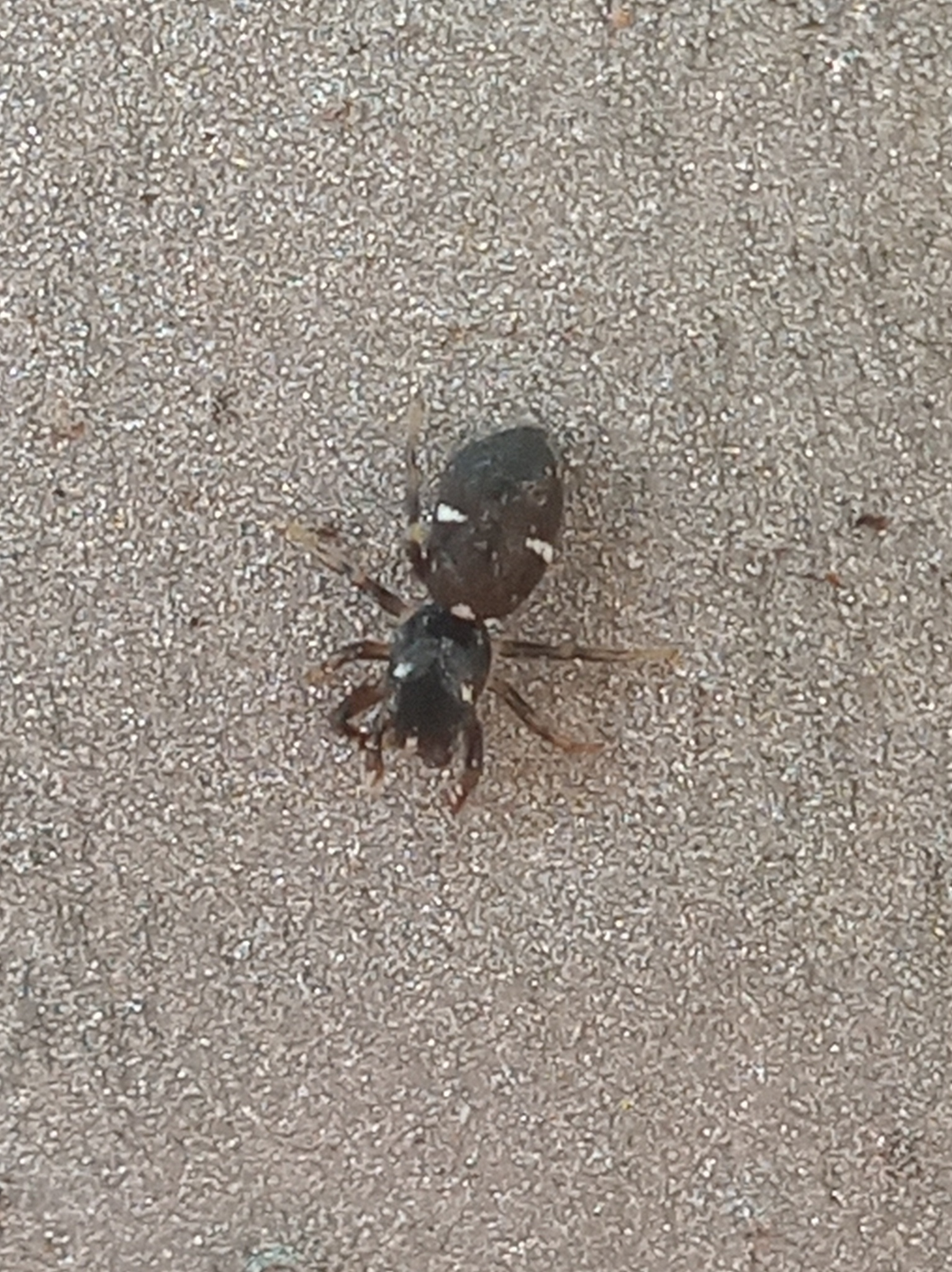

Scientific classification
- Kingdom: Animalia
- Phylum: Arthropoda
- Subphylum: Chelicerata
- Class: Arachnida
- Order: Araneae
- Infraorder: Araneomorphae
- Family: Salticidae
- Genus: Hyetussa
- Species: H. complicata

Binomial name
- Hyetussa complicata (Gertsch, 1936)

= Hyetussa complicata =

Species of spider

Hyetussa complicata is a species of jumping spider in the family Salticidae. It is found in the United States.
