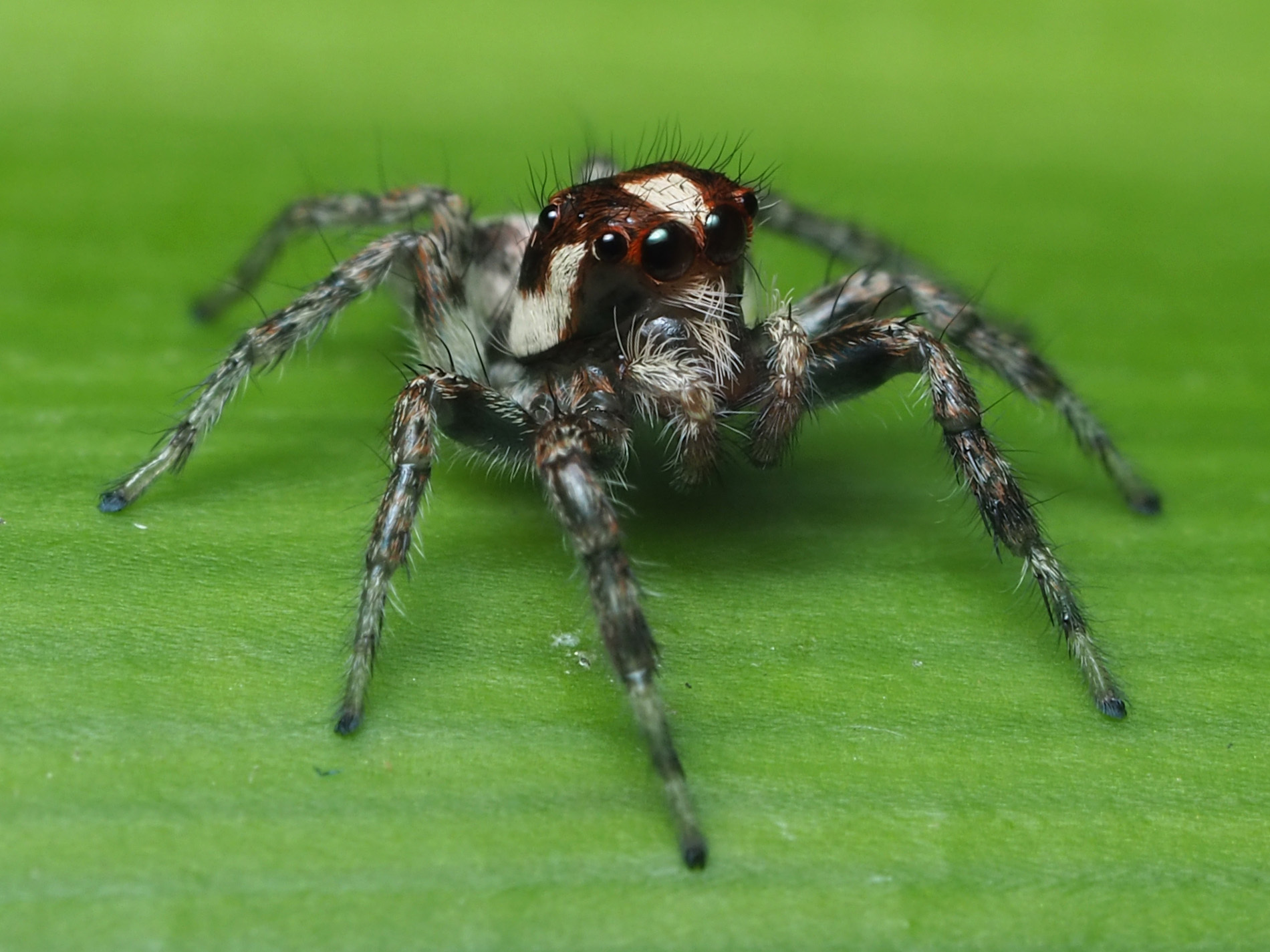
- male from Ecuador
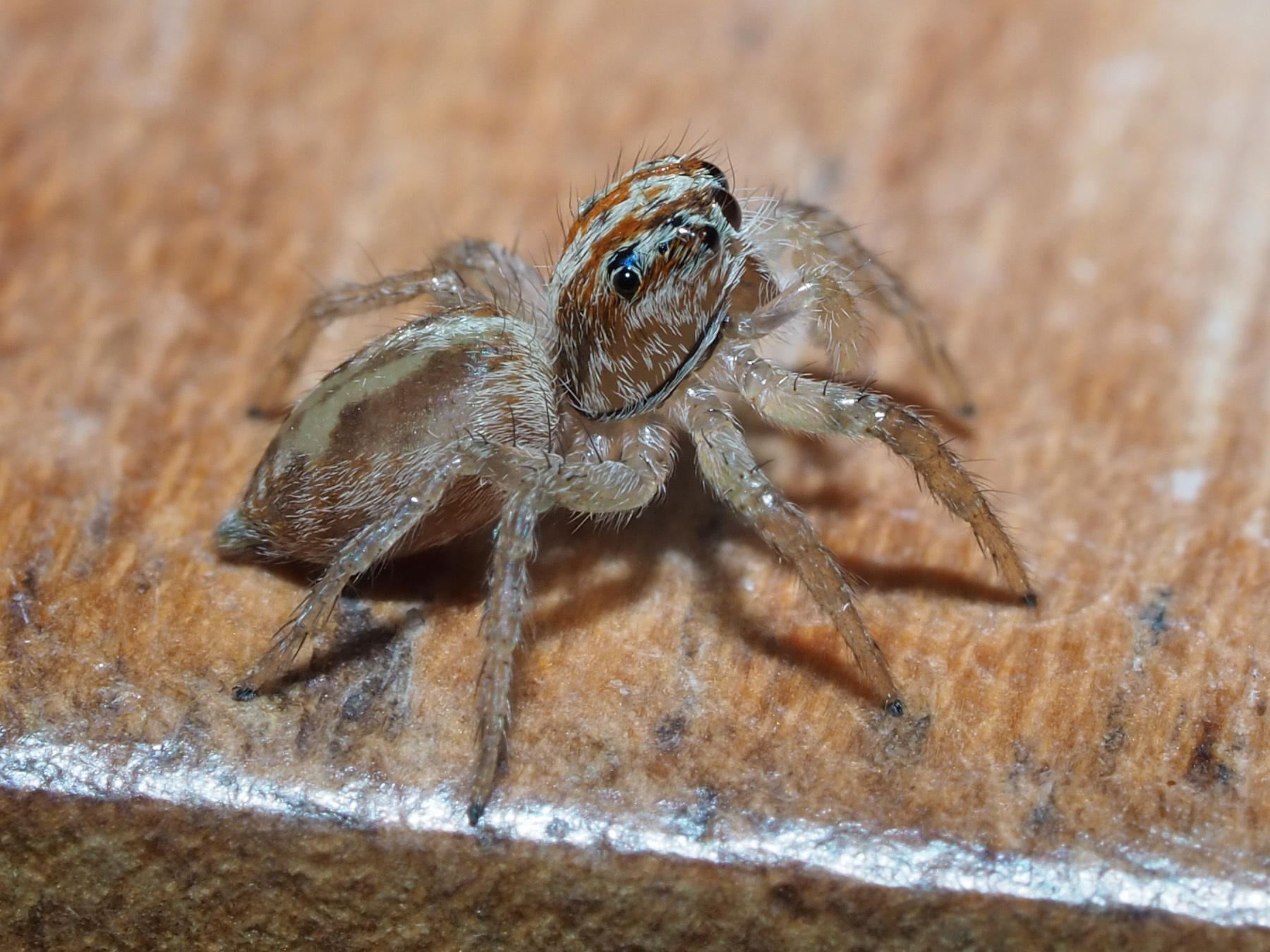
- immature female

Scientific classification
- Kingdom: Animalia
- Phylum: Arthropoda
- Subphylum: Chelicerata
- Class: Arachnida
- Order: Araneae
- Infraorder: Araneomorphae
- Family: Salticidae
- Genus: Frigga
- Species: F. crocuta

Binomial name
- Frigga crocuta (Taczanowski, 1878)

Synonyms
- Amycus crocutus Taczanowski, 1878; Sandalodes calvus Simon, 1902; Phiale bispinosa Banks, 1930; Phiale orvillei Chickering, 1946

= Frigga crocuta =

Species of jumping spider

Frigga crocuta is a species of jumping spider in the family Salticidae. Originally described from Peru in 1878, it has since been found throughout much of South America and has been introduced to several other regions worldwide.

== Taxonomy ==
The species was first described as Amycus crocutus by Polish arachnologist Władysław Taczanowski in 1878 based on specimens from Peru. The species has undergone several taxonomic revisions and name changes over the years.

In 1968, María Elena Galiano transferred the species from the genus Amycus to Phiale. Later, in 1979, she moved it to its current genus Frigga.

Several species have been synonymized with F. crocuta over the years, including Sandalodes calvus Simon, 1902, Phiale bispinosa Banks, 1930, and Phiale orvillei Chickering, 1946.

== Distribution ==
Frigga crocuta is native to South America, where it has been recorded from Colombia, Peru, Ecuador, and the Galápagos Islands. The species has been introduced to several other regions, including Britain, Australia (Queensland), and various Pacific Islands.

== Description ==
The original description by Taczanowski provides detailed morphological characteristics of both male and female specimens. Males have a total length of 8.5 mm, while females reach 10 mm. The cephalothorax is robust and elevated, with the thorax strongly rounded at the sides. The head is about as long as it is wide and only slightly distinct from the thorax, with a strongly inclined back and elevated clypeus.

The eye arrangement is regular, with the anterior lateral eyes having a diameter almost three times smaller than the median eyes. The abdomen is fusiform, swollen near its base, somewhat longer and much narrower than the cephalothorax. The mandibles are vertical and very strong, armed in the middle of their length with a prominent knot on their outer edge.

The coloration is variable but follows a consistent pattern. The front of the cephalothorax up to half the length of the thorax is bright reddish-brown, with the posterior part being darker brown. All eyes are mounted on a black spot. The interocular area is covered with light yellowish down that becomes reddish at the front. The abdomen shows considerable variation in coloration, typically with a pale yellowish base color and various brown markings and patterns.
