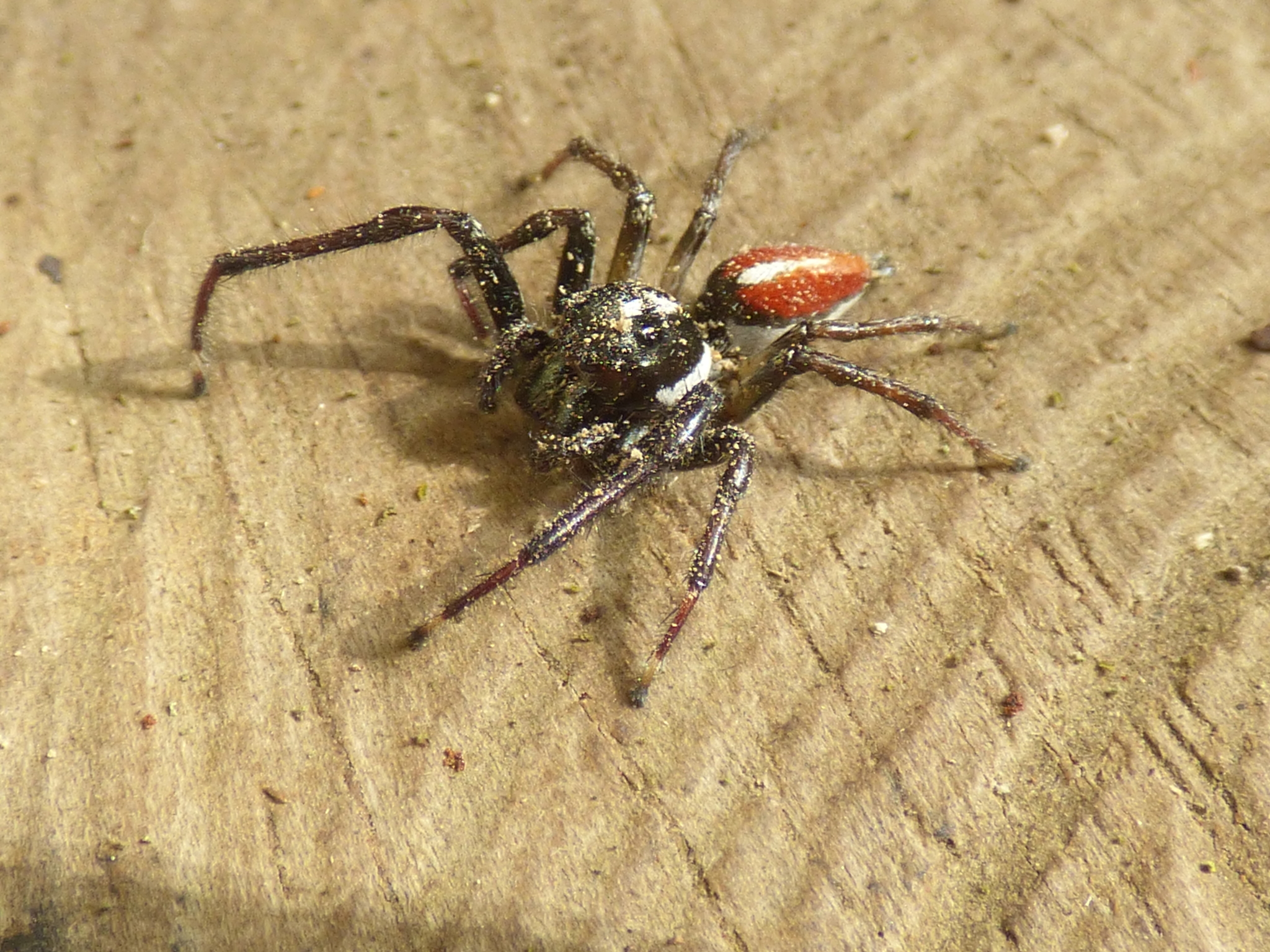
- Frigga coronigera

Scientific classification
- Kingdom: Animalia
- Phylum: Arthropoda
- Subphylum: Chelicerata
- Class: Arachnida
- Order: Araneae
- Infraorder: Araneomorphae
- Family: Salticidae
- Subfamily: Salticinae
- Genus: Frigga; C. L. Koch, 1850

Type species
- F. coronigera (C. L. Koch, 1846)

Species
- 10, see text

= Frigga (spider) =

Genus of spiders

Frigga is a genus of jumping spiders that was first described by Carl Ludwig Koch in 1850. The name is derived from Frigga, a Norse goddess.

== Distribution ==
Most species of Frigga are found in South America, but also with at least species Frigga pratensis ranging into Mexico, and Frigga flava only recorded in Guatemala. Possible introductions of Frigga crocuta have been recorded on the Polynesian Islands (after Berland 1933) and Australia (after Simon 1902):

== Species ==
As of January 2025 the genus Frigga contains ten species:

- Frigga coronigera (C. L. Koch, 1846) (type) – Brazil
- Frigga crocuta (Taczanowski, 1878) – Colombia, Peru, Ecuador, Galapagos Is., Australia (Queensland), French Polynesia (Marquesas Is., Society Is.)
- Frigga finitima Galiano, 1979 – Bolivia, Argentina
- Frigga flava (F. O. Pickard-Cambridge, 1901) – Guatemala
- Frigga kessleri (Taczanowski, 1871) – Brazil, Guyana, French Guiana
- Frigga opulenta Galiano, 1979 – Ecuador, Peru
- Frigga pratensis (Peckham & Peckham, 1885) – Mexico to Colombia
- Frigga quintensis (Tullgren, 1905) – Argentina, Brazil
- Frigga rufa (Caporiacco, 1947) – Guyana, Brazil
- Frigga simoni (Berland, 1913) – Ecuador

== Gallery ==
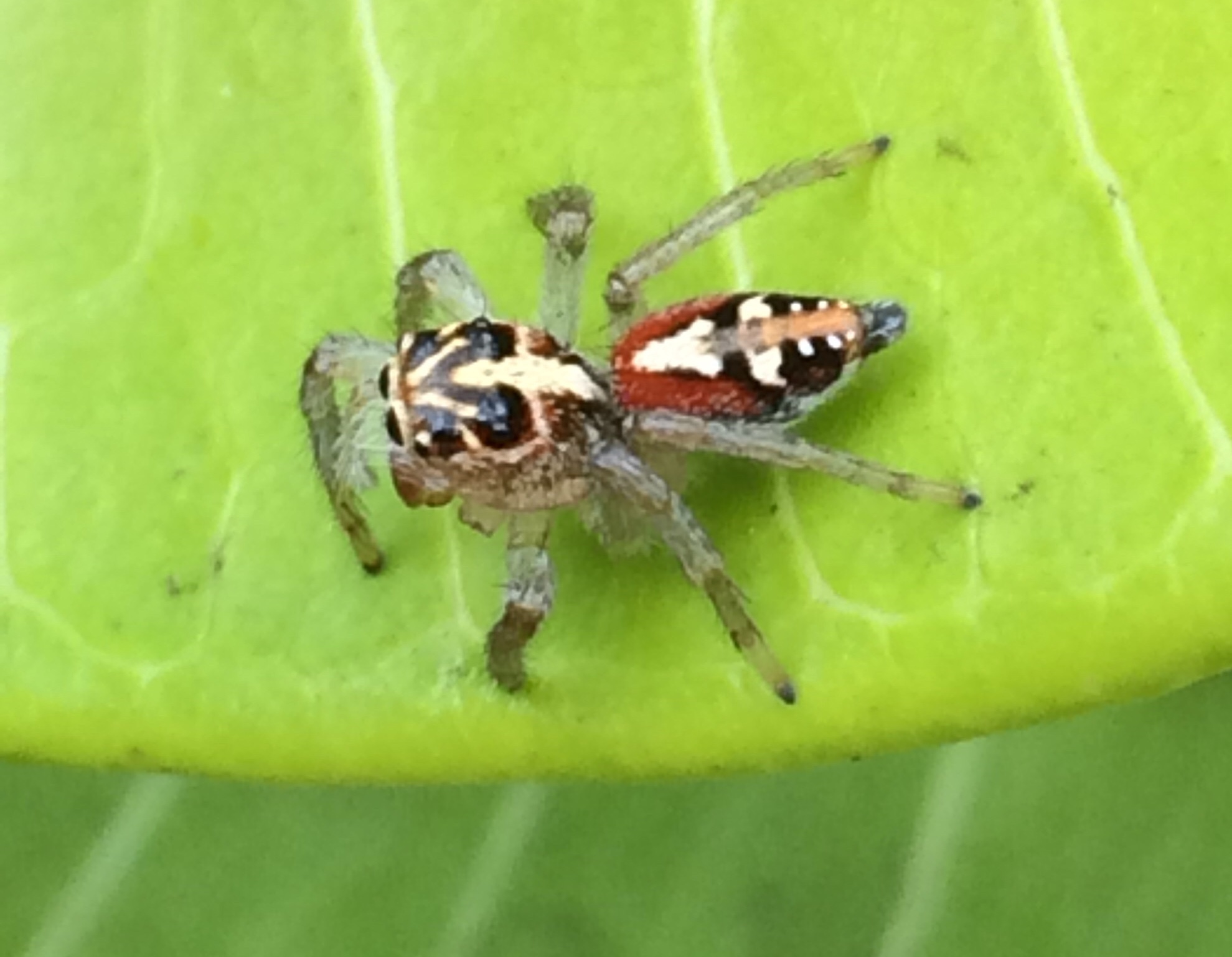
Juvenile Frigga quintensis in Salvador, Bahia, Brazil

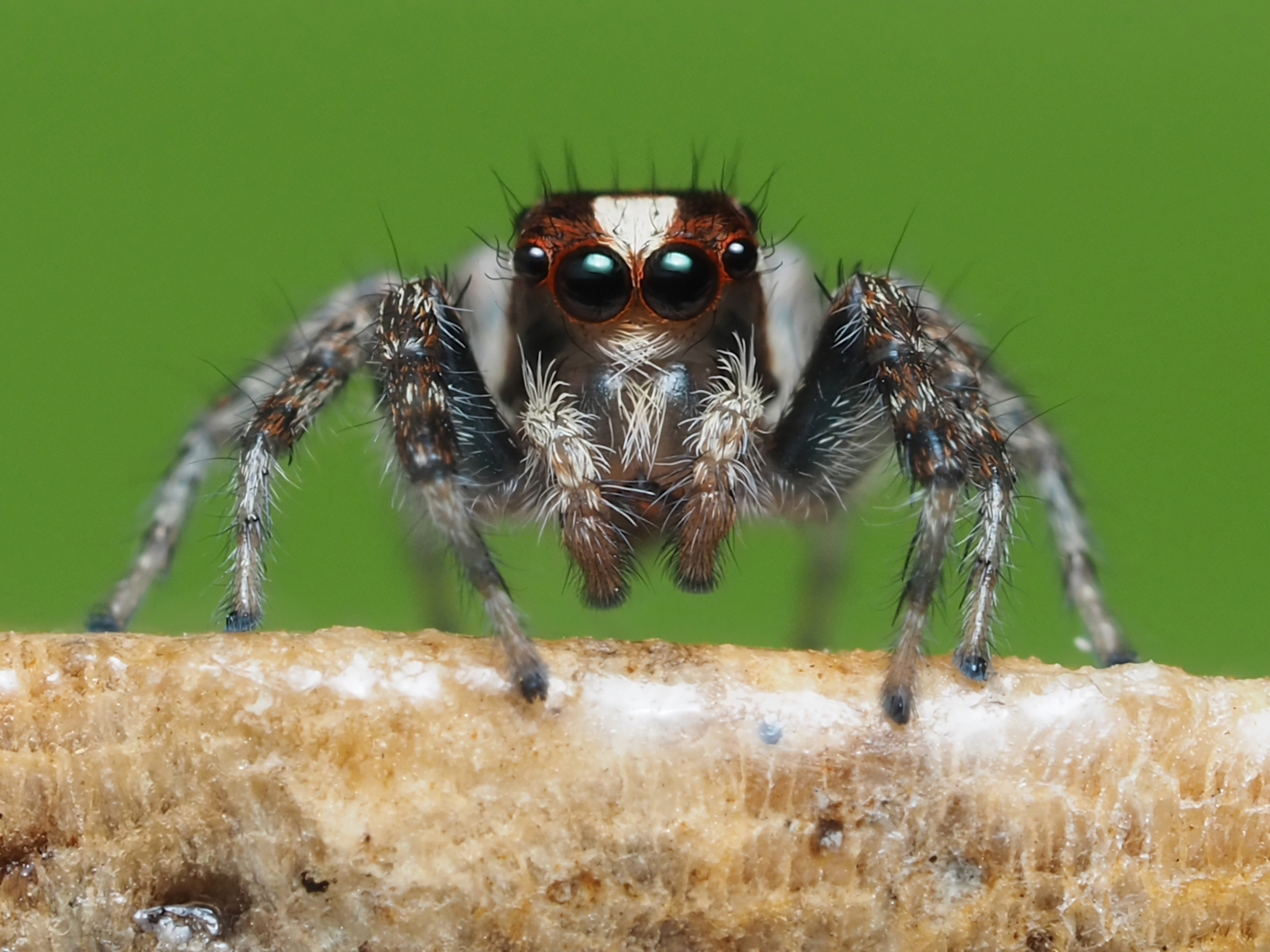
Male Frigga crocuta in Puerto Villamil, Ecuador
