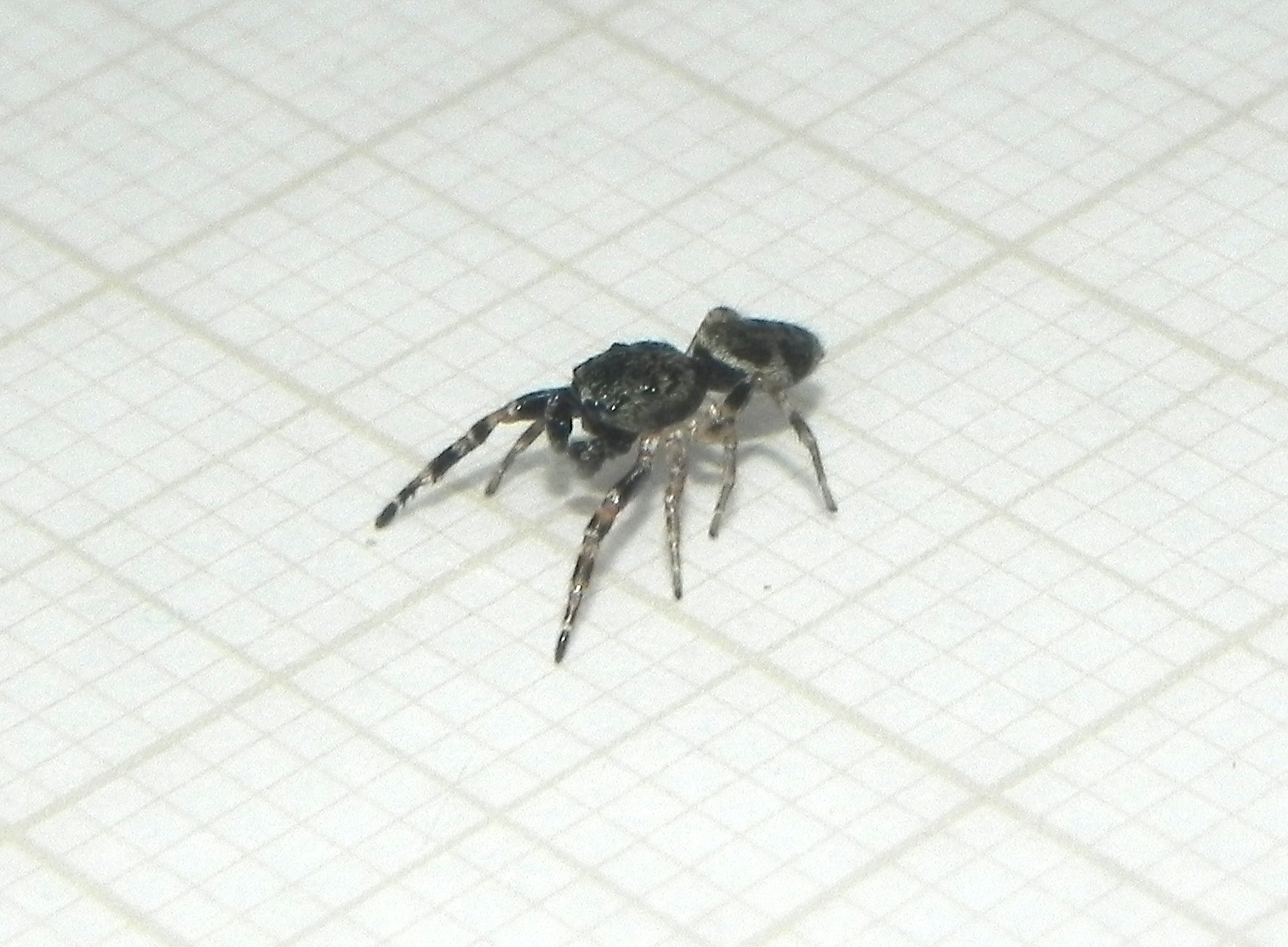
- Hyetussa sergipe

Scientific classification
- Kingdom: Animalia
- Phylum: Arthropoda
- Subphylum: Chelicerata
- Class: Arachnida
- Order: Araneae
- Infraorder: Araneomorphae
- Family: Salticidae
- Subfamily: Salticinae
- Genus: Hyetussa; Simon, 1902

Type species
- Hyetussa simoni Galiano, 1976

Species
- See text.

Synonyms
- Bredana Gertsch, 1936; Micalula Strand, 1932

= Hyetussa =

Genus of spiders

Hyetussa is a genus of the spider family Salticidae (jumping spiders).

== Species ==
As of May 2018, the World Spider Catalog lists the following species in the genus Hyetussa:

- Hyetussa aguilari Galiano, 1978 – Peru
- Hyetussa alternata Gertsch, 1936 - United States
- Hyetussa andalgalaensis Galiano, 1976 – Argentina
- Hyetussa complicata Gertsch, 1936 - United States
- Hyetussa cribrata (Simon, 1901) – Paraguay, Argentina
- Hyetussa mesopotamica Galiano, 1976 – Argentina
- Hyetussa secta (Mello-Leitão) – Argentina
- Hyetussa sergipe Bustamante & Ruiz, 2017 - Brazil
- Hyetussa simoni Galiano, 1976 (type species) – Venezuela
- Hyetussa tremembe Bustamante & Ruiz, 2017 - Brazil
