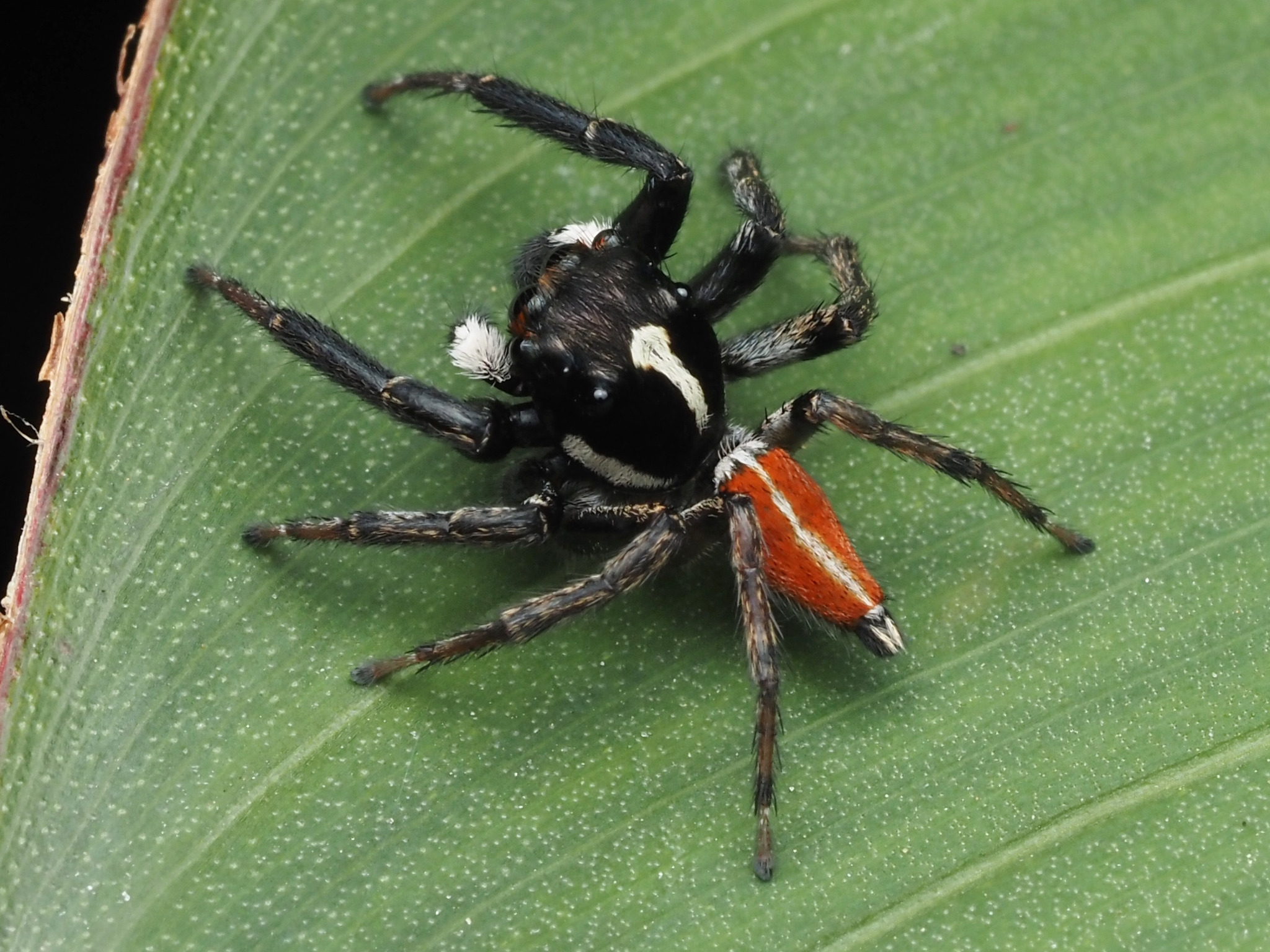
- Nycerella sanguinea

Scientific classification
- Kingdom: Animalia
- Phylum: Arthropoda
- Subphylum: Chelicerata
- Class: Arachnida
- Order: Araneae
- Infraorder: Araneomorphae
- Family: Salticidae
- Subfamily: Salticinae
- Genus: Nycerella; Galiano, 1982

Type species
- Cyrene decorata Peckham & Peckham, 1893

Species
- See text

Diversity
- 8 species

Synonyms
- Cyrene Peckham & Peckham

= Nycerella =

Genus of spiders

Nycerella is a genus of spiders of the jumping spider family, Salticidae.

The genus was renamed from Cyrene Peckham & Peckham, 1893, because the name was preoccupied.

== Species ==
As of June 2017, the World Spider Catalog lists the following species in the genus:

- Nycerella aprica (Peckham & Peckham, 1896) – Brazil, Paraguay, Argentina
- Nycerella decorata (Peckham & Peckham, 1893) – Panama, Colombia, St. Vincent
- Nycerella delecta (Peckham & Peckham, 1896) – Mexico to Panama
- Nycerella donaldi (Chickering, 1946) – Panama
- Nycerella melanopygia Galiano, 1982 – Brazil
- Nycerella neglecta Galiano, 1982 – Panama to Ecuador
- Nycerella sanguinea (Peckham & Peckham, 1896) – Guatemala to Panama
- Nycerella volucripes Galiano, 1982 – Brazil, Peru
