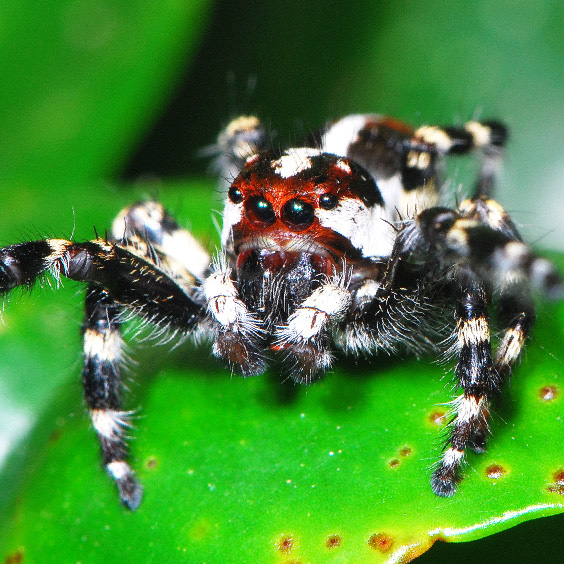
- Male Wedoquella apnnea in Chaco Province, Argentina

Scientific classification
- Kingdom: Animalia
- Phylum: Arthropoda
- Subphylum: Chelicerata
- Class: Arachnida
- Order: Araneae
- Infraorder: Araneomorphae
- Family: Salticidae
- Subfamily: Salticinae
- Genus: Wedoquella; Galiano, 1984

Type species
- W. denticulata Galiano, 1984

Species
- 5, see text

= Wedoquella =

Genus of spiders

Wedoquella is a genus of South American jumping spiders that was first described by María Elena Galiano in 1984. They reach a body length of about 5 to 11 millimetres (0.20 to 0.43 in), and are most closely related to Phiale in general appearance. The genus name is an arbitrary combination of letters with the suffix "-ella".

== Species ==
As of September 2019 it contains five species, found in Paraguay, Bolivia, and Argentina:

- Wedoquella apnnea Rubio, Nadal & Edwards, 2019 – Argentina
- Wedoquella denticulata Galiano, 1984 (type) – Argentina
- Wedoquella karadya Rubio, Baigorria & Edwards, 2019 – Argentina
- Wedoquella macrothecata Galiano, 1984 – Argentina
- Wedoquella punctata (Tullgren, 1905) – Bolivia, Paraguay, Argentina
