= María Elena Galiano =

Argentine arachnologist (1928–2000)

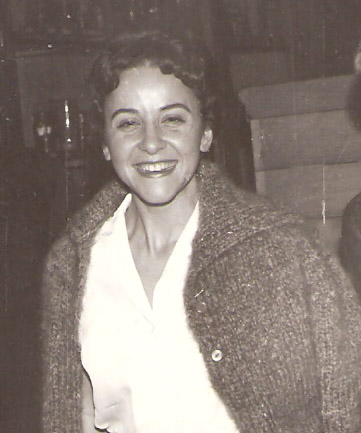
Portrait of the Argentinian arachnologist María Elena Galiano, specialist in subtropical spiders.

María Elena Galiano (1928 – October 30, 2000) was an Argentine arachnologist. She was one of the leading taxonomists of Neotropical jumping spiders. Galiano worked at the Bernardino Rivadavia Natural Sciences Museum in Buenos Aires. She died in an accident on October 30, 2000. The genera Galianora and Galianoella are named in her honor.

== Taxa described ==
Galiano described numerous species and genera of spiders. She is the authority for the following genera:

- Admesturius Galiano, 1988
- Hisukattus Galiano, 1987
- Kalcerrytus Galiano, 2000
- Nycerella Galiano, 1982
- Simonurius Galiano, 1988
- Sumampattus Galiano, 1983
- Trydarssus Galiano, 1995
- Wedoquella Galiano, 1984
- Yepoella Galiano, 1970
