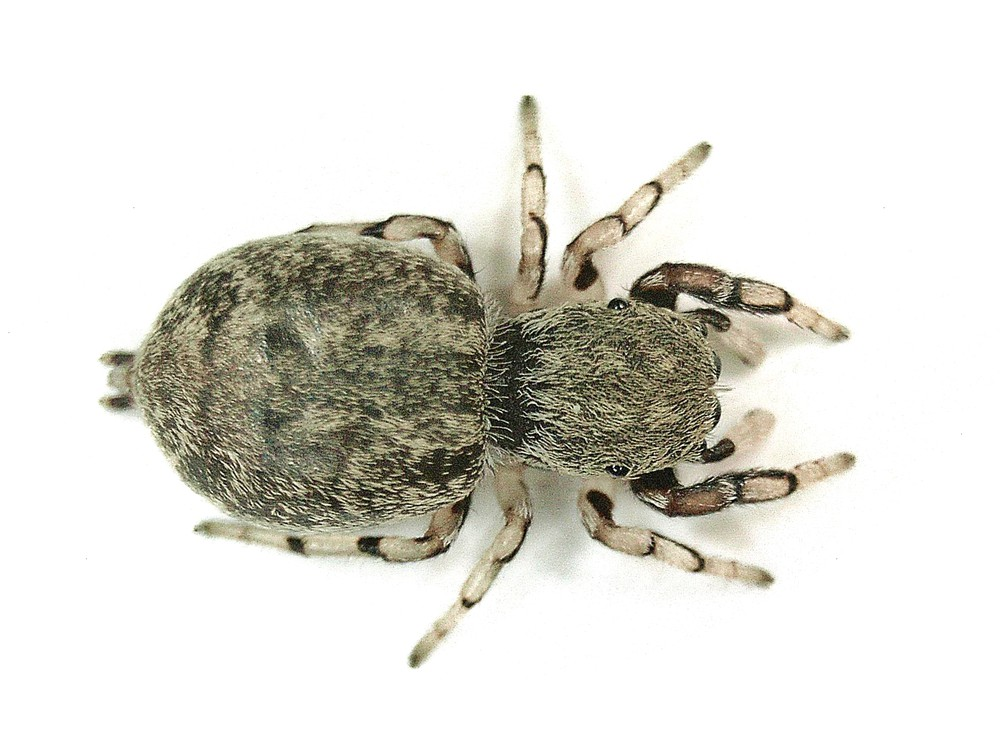
- female
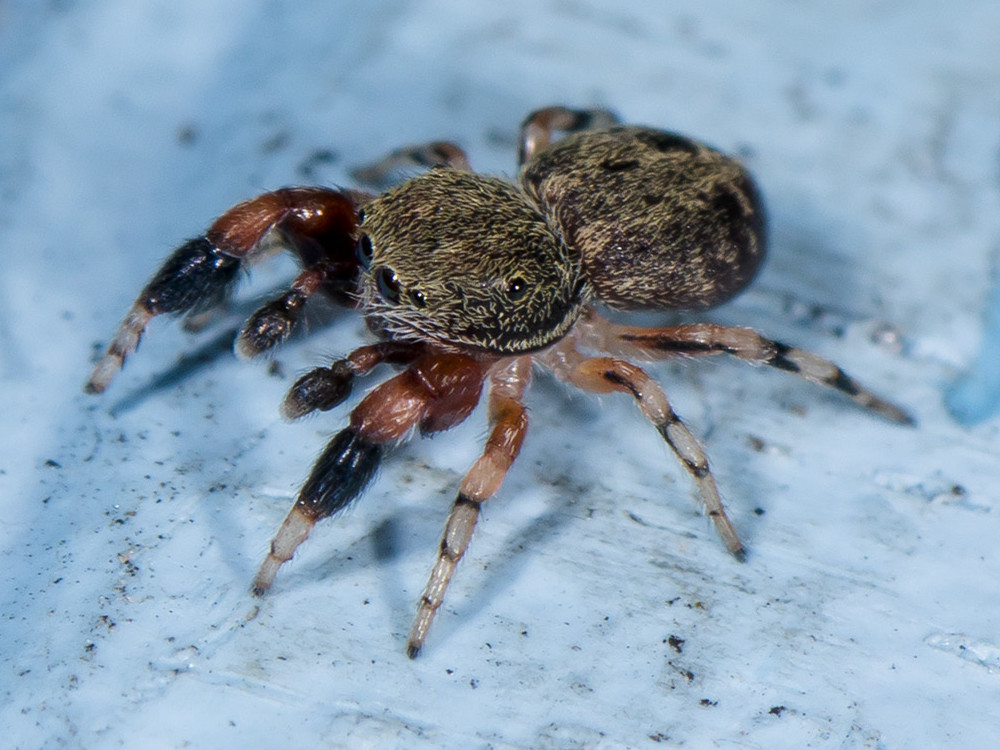
- Adult male

Scientific classification
- Kingdom: Animalia
- Phylum: Arthropoda
- Subphylum: Chelicerata
- Class: Arachnida
- Order: Araneae
- Infraorder: Araneomorphae
- Family: Salticidae
- Genus: Ballus
- Species: B. chalybeius

Binomial name
- Ballus chalybeius (Walckenaer, 1802)
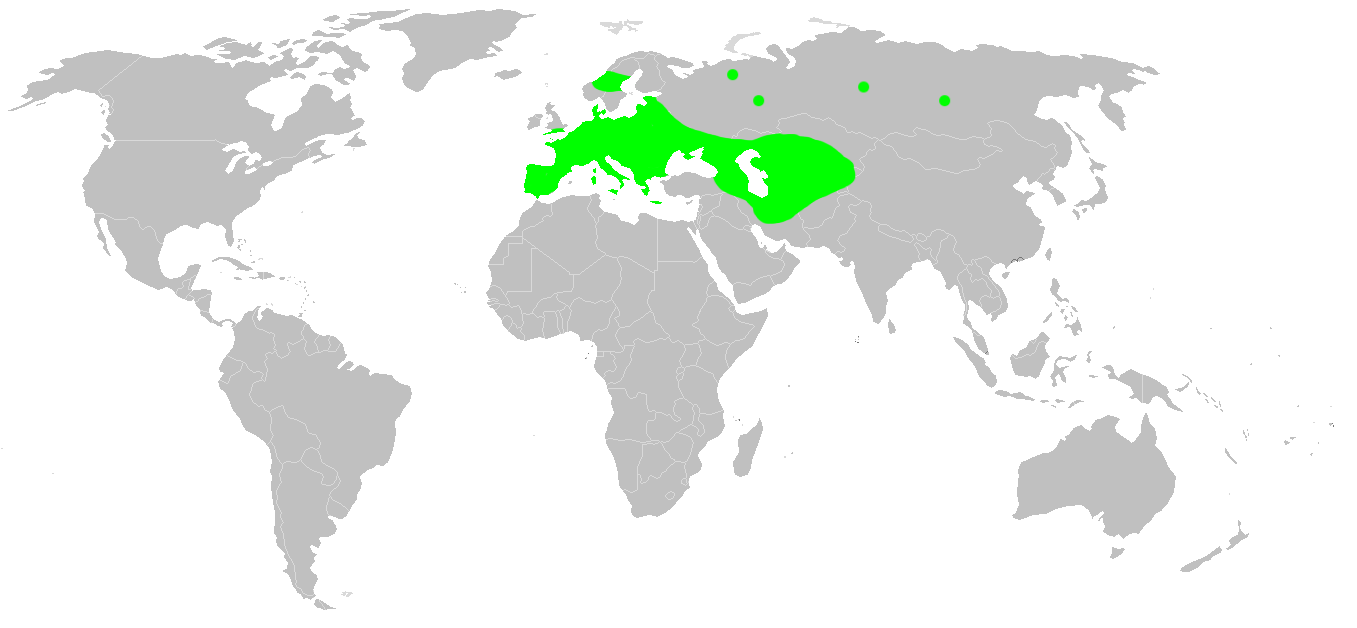

Synonyms
- Aranea depressa Aranea chalybeia Attus chalybeius Salticus annulipes Attus annulipes Salticus brevipes Salticus heterophthalmus Euophrys suralis Euophrys brevipes Marpissa brevipes Attus heterophthalmus Salticus obscurus Ballus heterophthalmus Attus brevipes Attus quinquefoveolatus Attus biimpressus Balla heterophthalma Dendryphantes annulipes Dendryphantes brevipes Attus seguipes Ballus depressus Ballus obscurus

= Ballus chalybeius =

Oak Jumping Spider

Species of spider

Ballus chalybeius is a jumping spider. It is the type species of the genus Ballus.

== Appearance ==
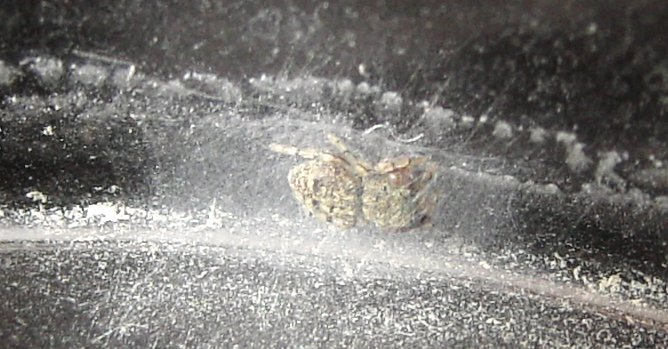
subadult male in retreat

Drawing of male (1868)

This flattened spider can reach a length of 3–4 millimetres (0.12–0.16 in). The prosoma is dark brown in females, with irregular lighter markings. The lightly yellow legs have dark rings in both sexes. In males, which are generally darker, the first legs are dark and thickened. The species is similar to Ballus rufipes, which is smaller and much darker.

== Habits ==
During summer, the female builds a flat silken retreat on the underside of a leaf and guards its egg sac inside.

== Habitat ==
It can be found mostly on the fringes of deciduous forests, on broad-leaved bushes and trees, particularly oaks, and in the grass. In Central Europe, they are widely distributed and in most areas quite common.

== Distribution ==
Ballus chalybeius occurs in Europe, North Africa to Central Asia.

== Name ==
The species name is derived from Ancient Greek chalyb- "steel".
