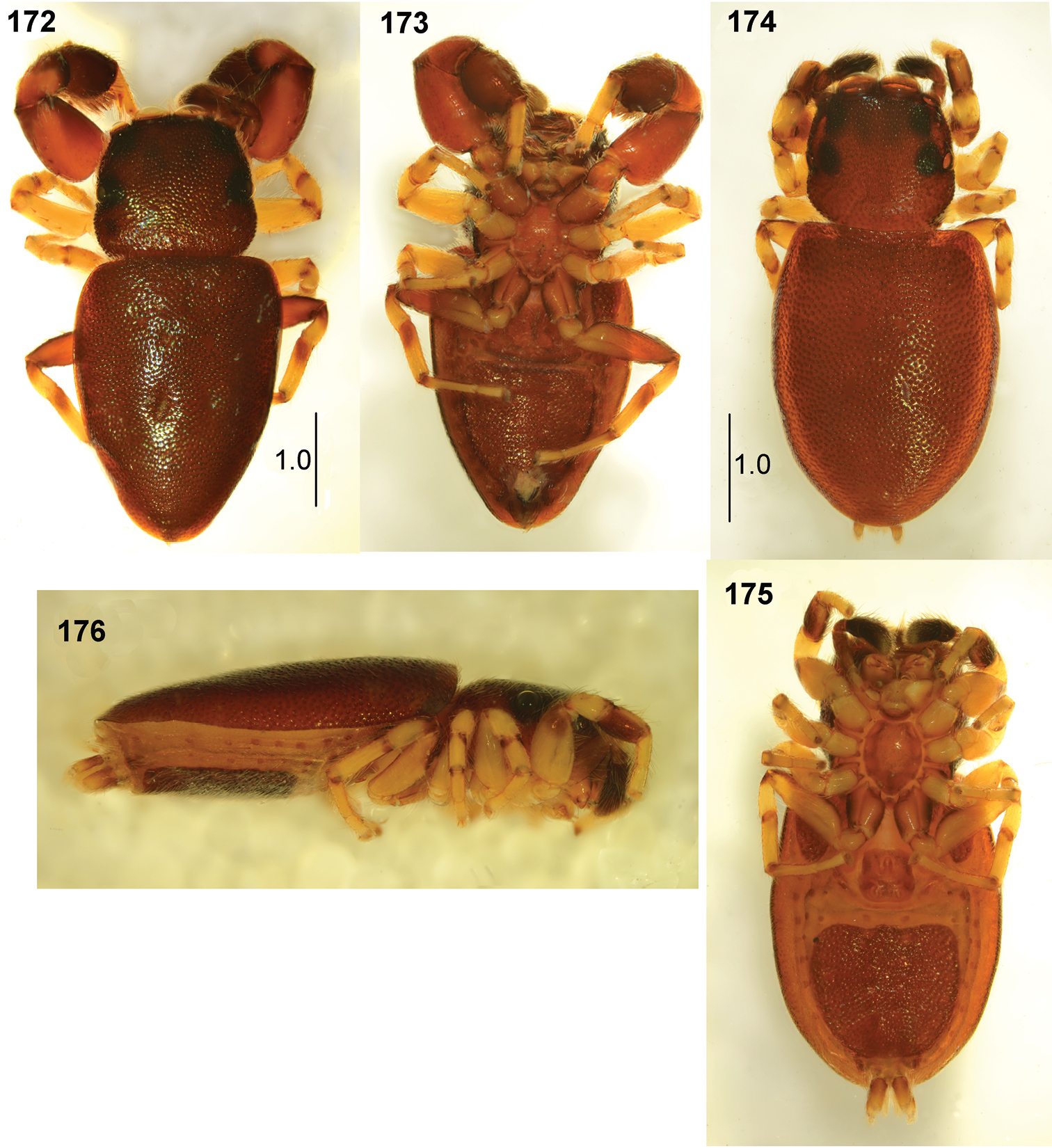
- Views from above, below, and the side of female and male specimens from the Republic of the Congo

Scientific classification
- Kingdom: Animalia
- Phylum: Arthropoda
- Subphylum: Chelicerata
- Class: Arachnida
- Order: Araneae
- Infraorder: Araneomorphae
- Family: Salticidae
- Genus: Peplometus
- Species: P. congoensis

Binomial name
- Peplometus congoensis Wesołowska, Azarkina & Wiśniewski, 2020

= Peplometus congoensis =

Species of jumping spider

Peplometus congoensis is a species of jumping spider that was first found in Republic of the Congo, after which it is named. It was subsequently also seen in Democratic Republic of the Congo. A member of the genus Peplometus, it is a small spider with a forward section, known as a cephalothorax, that is between 1.2 and 1.7 mm long and, behind that, an abdomen that is between 2.6 and 3 mm long. The male is larger than the female. The spider is generally brown with black areas on the female's carapace and sternum, the top and bottom of its cephalothorax. Its abdomen has two hard plates called scuta that resemble the elytra of beetles, accentuating a similarity that the species shares with others in the genus to beetles of the genus Chrysomelidae. It can be distinguished from others in the genus by its legs. They are generally creamy or yellowish-brown with darker patches; the front legs are larger than the remainder and, in the male, black. The spider was first described by the arachnologists Wanda Wesołowska, Galina Azarkina and Konrad Wiśniewski in 2020.

== Taxonomy and etymology ==
Peplometus congoensis is a species of jumping spider, a member of the family Salticidae, that was first described in 2020 by the arachnologists Wanda Wesołowska, Galina Azarkina and Konrad Wiśniewski. It is one of over 500 different species identified by Wesołowska in her career. The specific name comes from the place where it was first found. The authors allocated the spider to the genus Peplometus, first circumscribed in 1900 by Eugène Simon.

When he first established the genus, Simon assigned Peplometus to the Balleae group alongside the related genus Pachyballus. In their 2003 phylogenetic analysis, Wayne Maddison and Marshall Hedin noted that Pachyballus is closely related to Mantisatta, despite the large physiological differences between them, and the similarity of those spiders with a group of genera they termed Marpissoida but made no comment on Peplometus. In 2015, Maddison listed both genera within the tribe Ballini, derived from Simon's original name for the related genus Ballus, but attributed to an earlier author, Nathan Banks from 1892. He allocated the tribe to the clade Marpissoida in the clade Salticoida. It is likely that the ballines diverged from the wider Marpissoida clade between 20 and 25 million years ago, although Daniela Andriamalala estimated the family to be 3.99 million years old. In 2016, Jerzy Prószyński added the genus to a group of genera termed Ballines, which contains many of the same genera, including Ballus and Pachyballus.

== Description ==
Peplometus spiders are a wide-bodied and resemble beetles. Peplometus congoensis has a generally flattened appearance and has a pitted exterior that shows signs of sclerotization. The spider's body is divided into two main parts, a cephalothorax that integrates its head to the front and, behind that, an elongated abdomen. The female has a cephalothorax that measures between 1.2 and 1.3 mm (0.047 and 0.051 in) in length and between 1.1 and 1.3 mm (0.043 and 0.051 in) in width. Its carapace, the hard upper part of the cephalothorax, is rounded and brown to black. Its eye field stretches across approximately half of its length. There are dark bristles near the eyes in the front row but otherwise the spider is relatively hairless. Its sternum, the underside of the cephalothorax, is a blackish oval. The spider's yellowish-brown chelicerae, which act as its jaws, have a short fang, two small teeth to the front and a single tooth with three tips at the back. The remaining mouthparts, its labium and maxillae, are creamy.

The female abdomen is between 2.6 and 3 mm (0.10 and 0.12 in) in length and 1.8 and 1.9 mm (0.071 and 0.075 in) in width. A similar brown to the carapace, it is relatively narrow and elongated with an almost-straight edge at the front and a shape that tapers to the rear. There are noticeable hard plates or scuta, on the top; the front scutum is narrower and the rear one is a large trapezoid shape. There are many bumps on the bottom. These resemble the elytra of beetles and may be part of the spider's disguise. The spider has dark spinnerets that it uses to spin webs. Its legs are generally light and creamy but have darker patches. The front legs are larger than the others and have black sections and fine hairs on their tibia. It is its legs that most easily distinguish the spider from other members of the genus.

The male is larger the female. It has a cephalothorax that measures typically 1.7 mm (0.07 in) in length and 1.8 mm (0.07 in) in width. The male's carapace is a dark brown trapezoid with a black area around its eyes. There are a few bristles visible near the front row of eyes. Its sternum is light brown. The spider's chelicerae are similar to the female, with two teeth at the front and a single tooth at the back, but the back tooth has four rather than three tips. The remaining mouthparts are light brown.

The male's abdomen is longer and slightly wider than the cephalothorax, measuring typically 3 mm (0.12 in) in length and 2.2 mm (0.09 in) in width. Unlike the female, both the top and bottom have scuta. The scutum towards the back of the bottom of the abdomen is particularly large. It is dark brown like the spider's carapace. The spider has larger front legs than the rest, a feature more pronounced than the female's legs. They are brown with darker patches and black tibia. They are marked with long dense feather-like short hairs. The remaining legs are all yellowish-brown. The middle legs have some dark brown patches and the rear legs have brown rings on many of the segments. Unlike in other species in the genus, the front legs are black and not flattened.

Peplometus congoensis has distinctive copulatory organs. The male has a rounded cymbium next to a smaller palpal bulb. The bulb consists of a tegulum with a pronounced bulge at the bottom and a thin projection called an embolus extending from its top that wraps itself in tight coils before projecting away from the bulb. The small palpal tibia has a single spike, or tibial apophysis, projecting upwards. The female spider's epigyne, or external and most visible part of the female copulatory organs, is relatively large and rectangular. It has a semi-circular depression in the middle that is split into two by a short wide ridge. The two copulatory openings lead via short wide ducts to relatively small kidney-shaped receptacles called spermathecae.

== Distribution and habitat ==
Peplometus spiders generally live in Africa and have been found in Yemen. Peplometus congoensis lives in both Congos. The male holotype was found near Brazzaville in Republic of the Congo in 1963. Other examples have been found nearby. It was subsequently, in 2007, discovered in Democratic Republic of the Congo living in the Luki Biosphere Reserve. The spider lives in rainforests. Its habitat is under threat from deforestation and forest degradation, and is vulnerable to climate change impacts that threaten biodiversity. The implications on many of the species, including Peplometus congoensis, that live in the area and whether they can adapt to the changes are poorly understood. Its resemblance to beetles of the family Chrysomelidae may be a form of camouflage, enabling it to hide amongst the trees.
