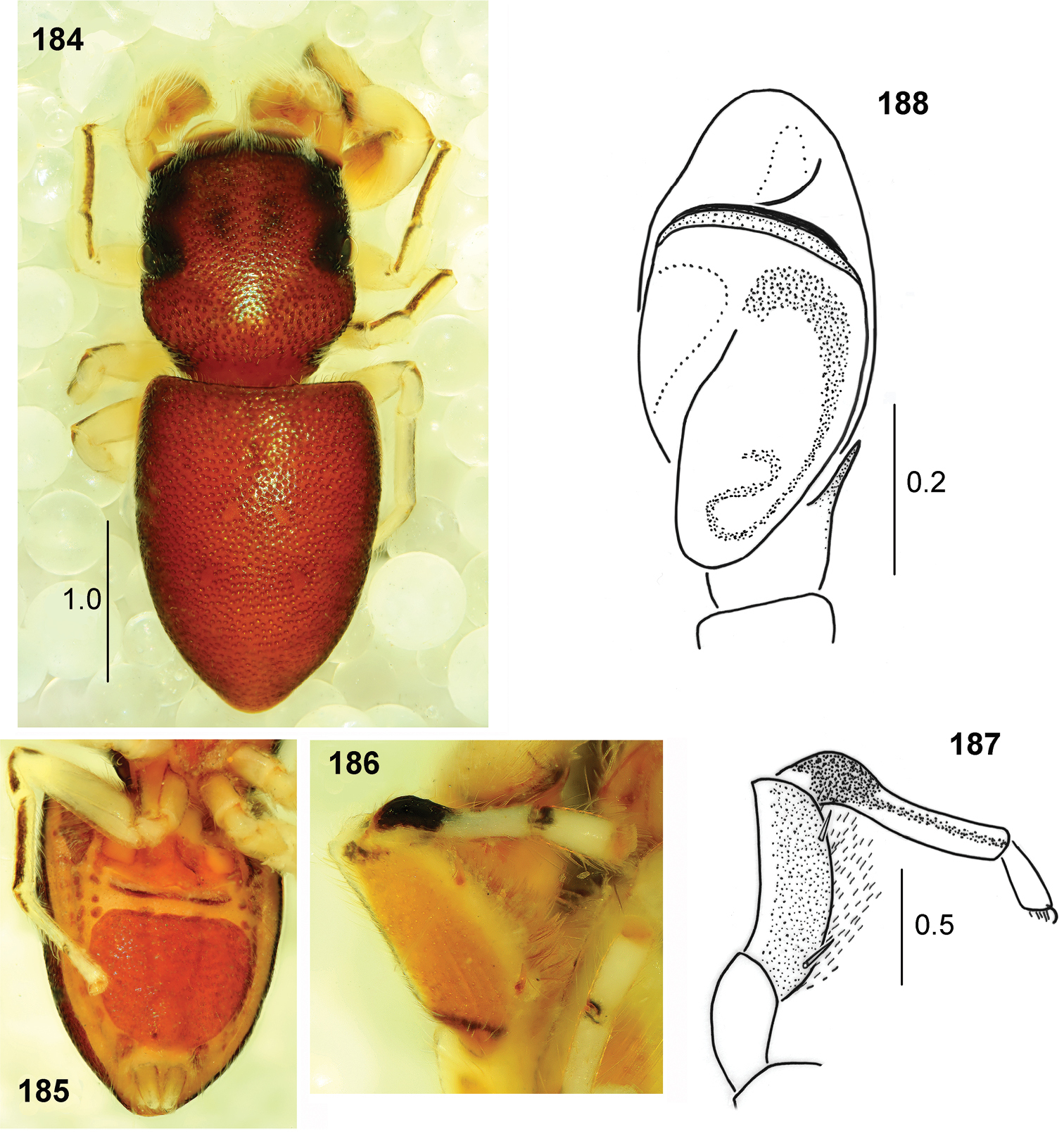
- The holotype. Figure 184 shows the whole spider and Figures 185 to 188 details

Scientific classification
- Kingdom: Animalia
- Phylum: Arthropoda
- Subphylum: Chelicerata
- Class: Arachnida
- Order: Araneae
- Infraorder: Araneomorphae
- Family: Salticidae
- Genus: Peplometus
- Species: P. nimba

Binomial name
- Peplometus nimba Wesołowska, Azarkina & Wiśniewski, 2020

= Peplometus nimba =

Species of jumping spider

Peplometus nimba is a species of jumping spider that was first found in the mountains of the Nimba Range in Guinea, after which it is named. A member of the genus Peplometus, it is typically 3.4 mm long and generally brown apart from its yellow mouthparts and sternum, part of its underside. It has two hard plates called scuta on the underside of its abdomen that resemble the elytra of beetles. In the same way as other spiders in the same genus, it may use this similarity as a form of camouflage. It can be distinguished from other spiders in the genus by its legs. These are generally yellow and lack spines, the front legs being lighter and stouter than the others. The male of this species was first described by the arachnologists Wanda Wesołowska, Galina Azarkina and Konrad Wiśniewski in 2020. The female has yet to be described.

== Taxonomy and etymology ==
Peplometus nimba is a species of jumping spider, a member of the family Salticidae, that was first described in 2020 by the arachnologists Wanda Wesołowska, Galina Azarkina and Konrad Wiśniewski. It is one of over 500 different species identified by Wesołowska in her career. The specific name comes from the place where it was first found, the Nimba Range. The authors allocated the spider to the genus Peplometus, first circumscribed in 1900 by Eugène Simon.

When he first established the genus, Simon assigned Peplometus to the Balleae group alongside the related genus Pachyballus. In their 2003 phylogenetic analysis, Wayne Maddison and Marshall Hedin noted that Pachyballus is closely related to Mantisatta, despite the large physiological differences between them, and the similarity of those spiders with a group of genera they termed Marpissoida but made no comment on Peplometus. In 2015, Maddison listed both genera within the tribe Ballini, derived from Simon's original name for the related genus Ballus, but attributed to an earlier author, Nathan Banks from 1892. He allocated the tribe to the clade Marpissoida in the clade Salticoida. It is likely that the ballines diverged from the wider Marpissoida clade between 20 and 25 million years ago, although Daniela Andriamalala estimated the family to be 3.99 million years old. In 2016, Jerzy Prószyński added the genus to a group of genera termed Ballines, which contains many of the same genera, including Ballus and Pachyballus. The holotype is stored at the Natural History Museum, London.

== Description ==
Peplometus spiders are a wide-bodied and resemble beetles. Peplometus nimba has a generally flattened appearance and has a pitted exterior that shows signs of sclerotization as shown in Figure 184. The spider's body is divided into two main parts, a cephalothorax that integrates its head to the front and, behind that, an elongated abdomen. The male has a cephalothorax that measures typically 1.4 mm (0.055 in) in length and 1.2 mm (0.047 in) in width. Its carapace, the hard upper part of the cephalothorax, is shaped like a trapezium and is brown with a blackish area area around its eyes. Its sternum, the underside of the cephalothorax, is yellow, as are most of its mouthparts, including its labium and maxillae. The spider's chelicerae, which act as its jaws, have a short fang, two small teeth to the front and five teeth at the back.

The male abdomen is typically 2 mm (0.079 in) in length and 1.4 mm (0.055 in) in width. It is elongated and shaped like a shield with a straight front edge and a rounded rear. There is a noticeable hard plate, or scuta, on the top and two on the bottom. The layout of the ones on the bottom shown in Figure 185. These resemble the elytra of beetles and may be part of the spider's disguise. The spider has yellow spinnerets that it uses to spin webs. Its legs are generally yellow and lack spines. The front legs are lighter and stouter than the others and have brown streaks on them. They are shown in Figures 186 and 187. It is its legs that most easily distinguish the spider from other members of the genus, particularly the otherwise similar Peplometus oyo.

The male has yellow pedipalps. At the end, are its copulatory organs, which includes a rounded cymbium next to a smaller palpal bulb as shown in Figure 188. The bulb consists of a tegulum with a pronounced bulge at the bottom and a thin projection called an embolus extending from its top that wraps itself in tight coils before projecting away from the bulb. The spider's thin palpal tibia has a single spike, or tibial apophysis, projecting upwards. The female has not been described.

== Distribution ==
Peplometus nimba is endemic to Guinea. The male holotype was found amongst the mountains of the Nimba Range in 1942. Like other members of its genus, its resemblance to beetles of the family Chrysomelidae may be a form of camouflage.
