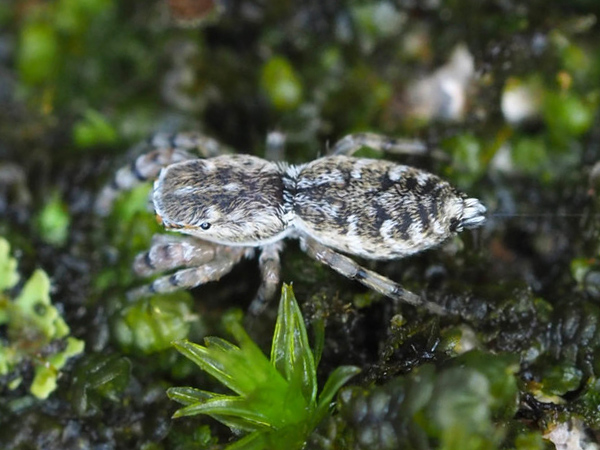
- Admestina sp. near Boston, Massachusetts

Scientific classification
- Kingdom: Animalia
- Phylum: Arthropoda
- Subphylum: Chelicerata
- Class: Arachnida
- Order: Araneae
- Infraorder: Araneomorphae
- Family: Salticidae
- Subfamily: Salticinae
- Genus: Admestina; Peckham & Peckham, 1888

Type species
- A. tibialis (C. L. Koch, 1846)

Species
- A. archboldi Piel, 1992; A. tibialis (C. L. Koch, 1846); A. wheeleri Peckham & Peckham, 1888

= Admestina =

Genus of spiders

Admestina is a genus of minute North American jumping spiders that was first described by George and Elizabeth Peckham in 1888.

== Species ==
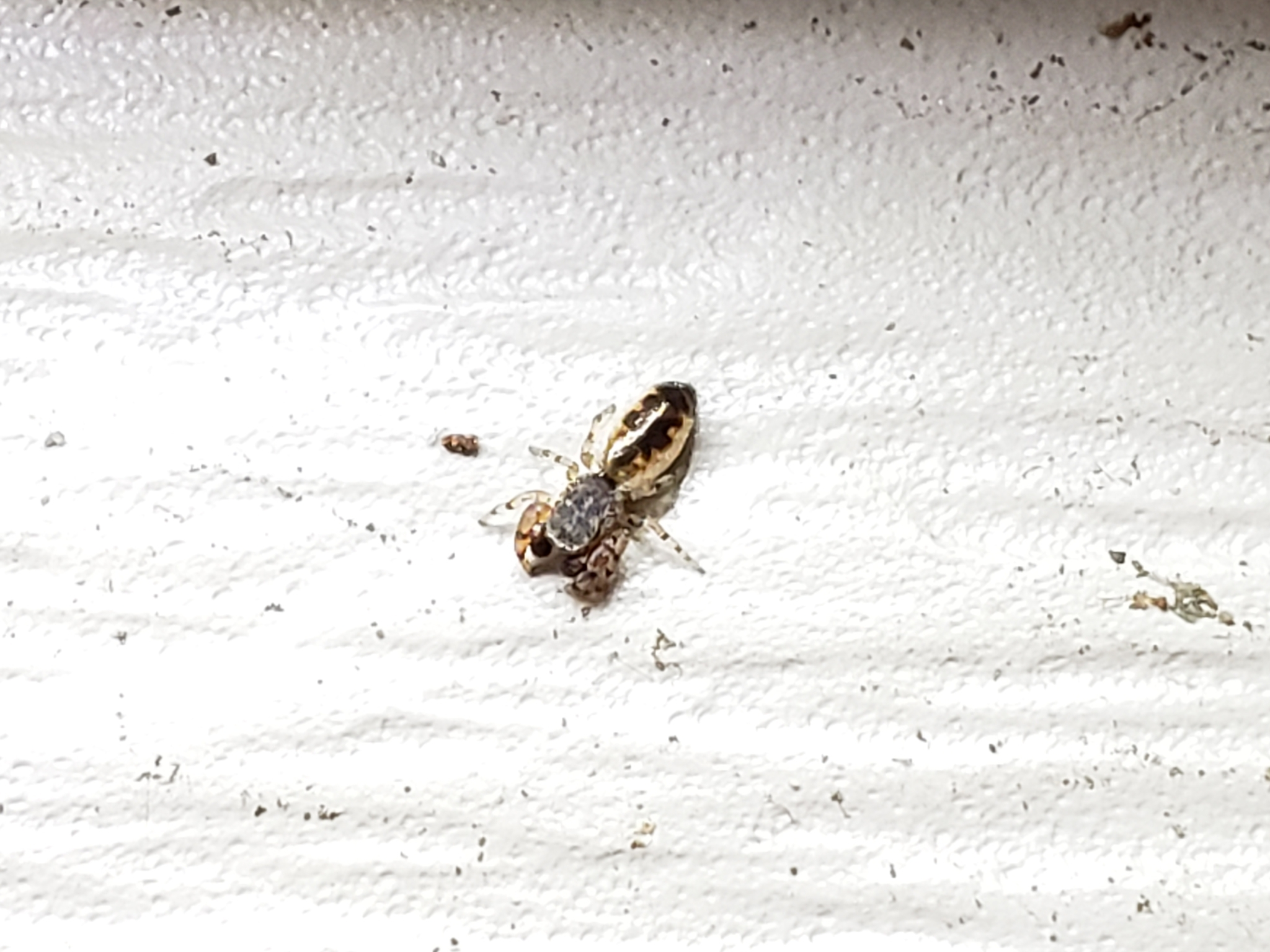
A. archboldi

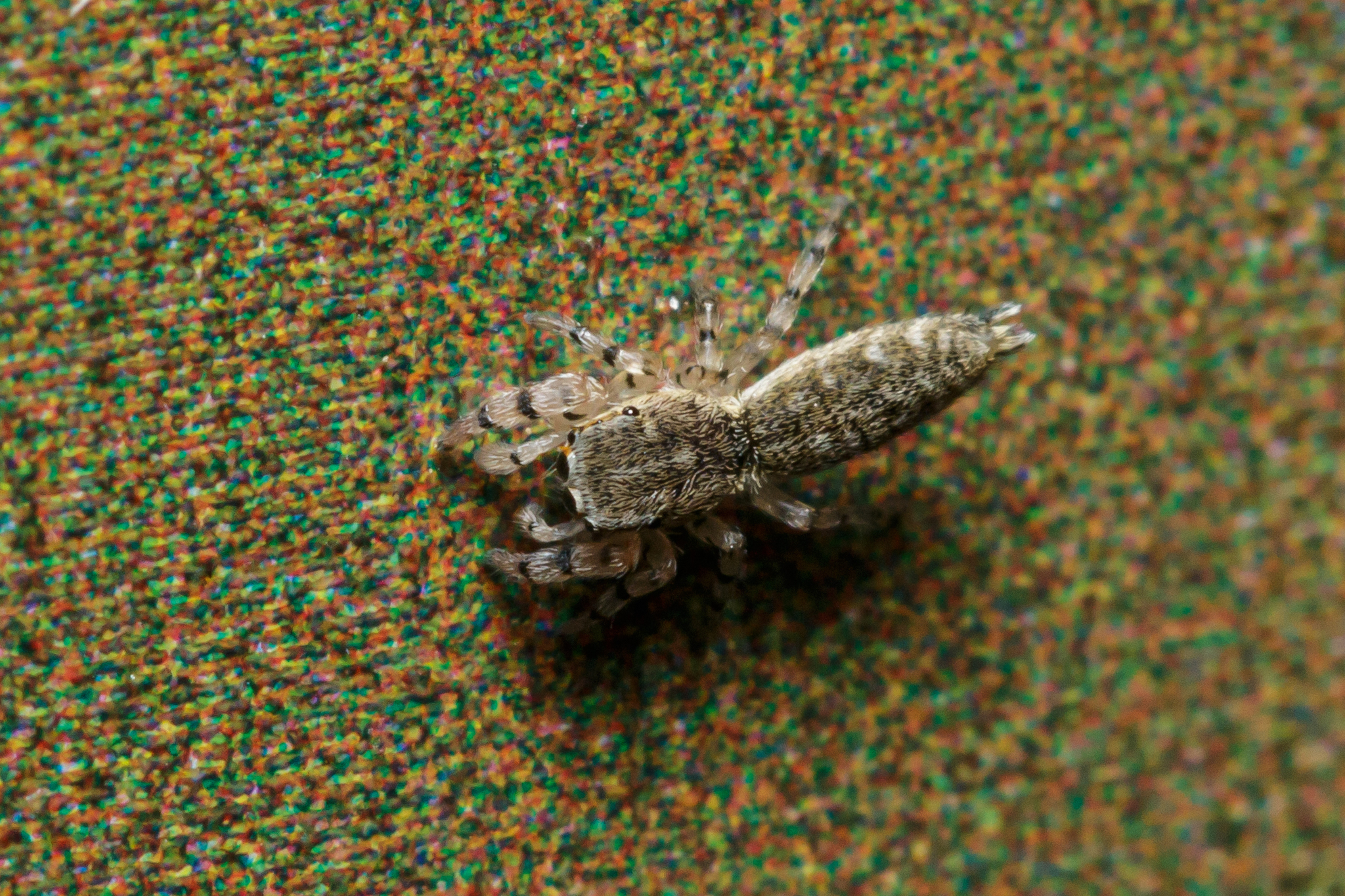
A. tibialis

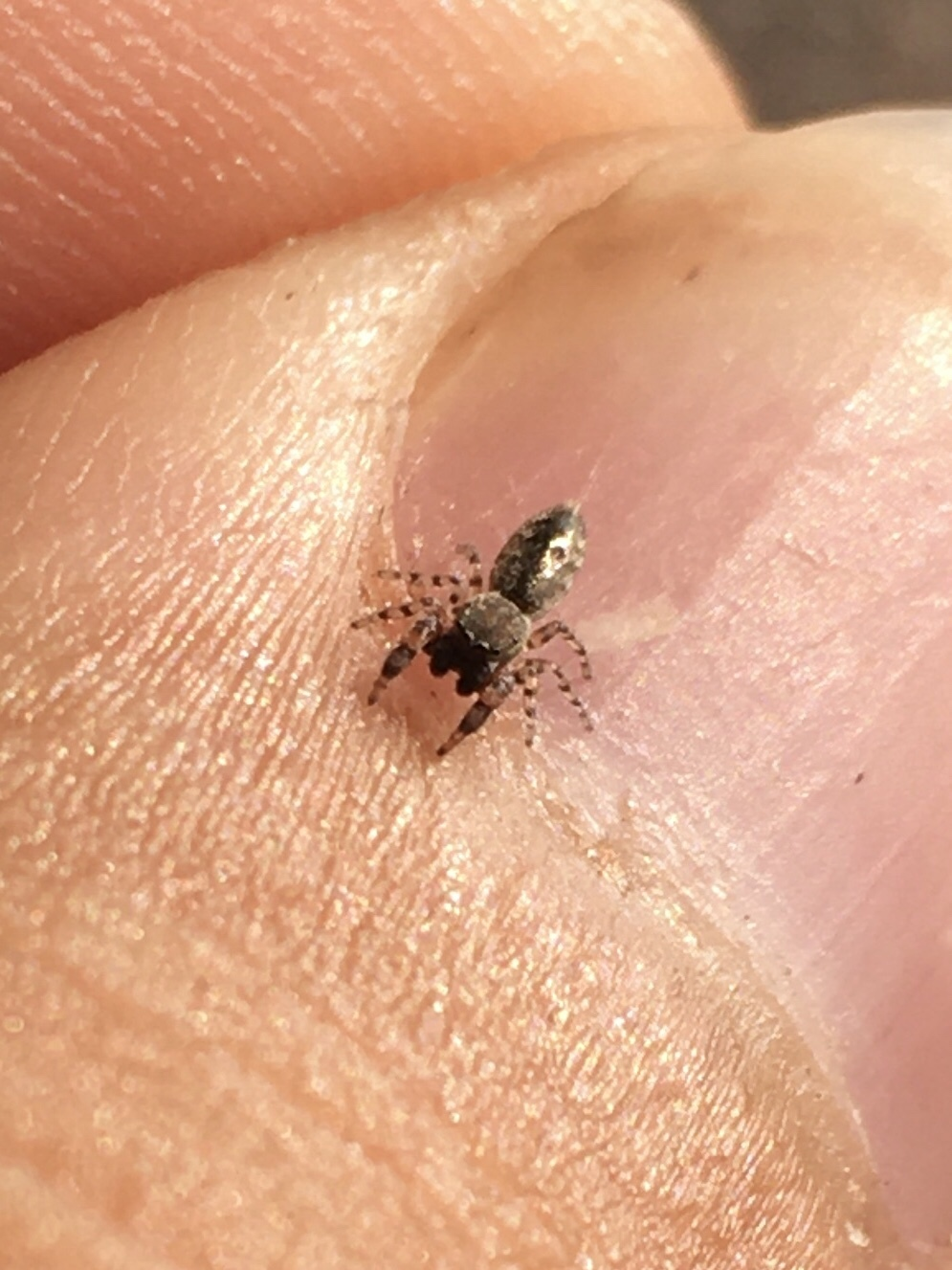
A. wheeleri

As of September 2025 the genus contains three species:

- Admestina archboldi Piel, 1992 — United States
- Admestina tibialis (C. L. Koch, 1846) — United States
- Admestina wheeleri Peckham & Peckham, 1888 — United States, Canada

The South American species Admesturius bitaeniatus was originally placed in Admestina, but was moved to Admesturius by María Elena Galiano in 1988.

== Description ==
Admestina are small and flat, typically measuring less than 4.5 mm in length. Their flattened cephalothorax may help them to hide within crevices on trees. The first legs are the stoutest, with the tibia thickened in both sexes. The three species are all similar in appearance and best distinguished by their geographic range and genitalia.

== Distribution ==
Admestina archboldi is found in the Southern United States, from Florida to Texas, generally between the 30th and 25th parallels. Admestina wheeleri is found in the Northern United States, from Massachusetts to North Dakota, and in Ontario, Canada. Its range roughly follows the 45th parallel. Admestina tibialis is found in the area in between, from Florida to Connecticut.

== Behavior ==
Little is known about the behavior of Admestina. They are typically found by beating tree branches. Females lay a small number of eggs (4 to 20) within a crevice in the bark of a tree.
