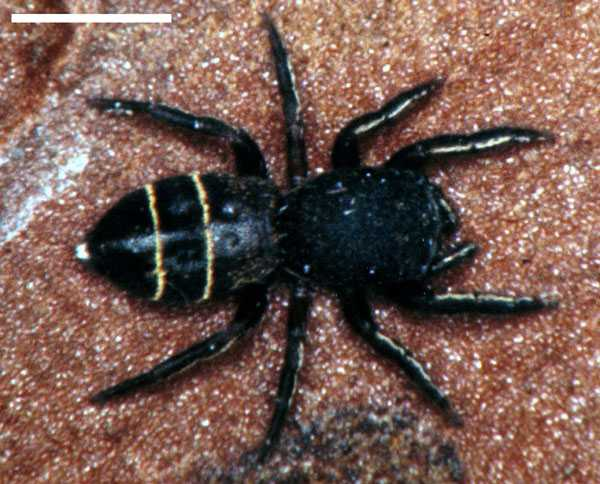
- Female Attidops nickersoni

Scientific classification
- Kingdom: Animalia
- Phylum: Arthropoda
- Subphylum: Chelicerata
- Class: Arachnida
- Order: Araneae
- Infraorder: Araneomorphae
- Family: Salticidae
- Subfamily: Salticinae
- Genus: Attidops; Banks, 1905

Type species
- Ballus youngii Peckham & Peckham, 1888

Species
- See text.

Diversity
- 4 species

= Attidops =

Genus of jumping spiders

Attidops is a genus of jumping spiders (family Salticidae). It is closely related to the genera Ballus, Admestina and Icius.

== Description ==
Attidops are from two to three millimeters in body length, with a dark reddish-brown prosoma which is darker around the eyes. On the underside, and on the legs they are reddish- to yellowish-brown. The entire body, but especially the sides are sparsely covered with short white hairs and translucent clear to white flattened hairs that look like scales. The sexes look similar to each other.

== Distribution ==
Spiders of this genus occur in North America from Canada to Mexico.

== Name ==
The genus name is combined from -attus, a common ending for salticid genera, and Greek -ops ("to look like"). Nathan Banks created the genus in 1905 via a footnote, stating simply "Attidops, a new genus for Ballus youngi Peck".

== Species ==
As of September 2024, the World Spider Catalog accepted the following species:

- Attidops cinctipes (Banks, 1900) – US
- Attidops cutleri (Edwards, 1999) – US, Mexico
- Attidops nickersoni (Edwards, 1999) – US
- Attidops youngi (Peckham & Peckham, 1888) – US, Canada
