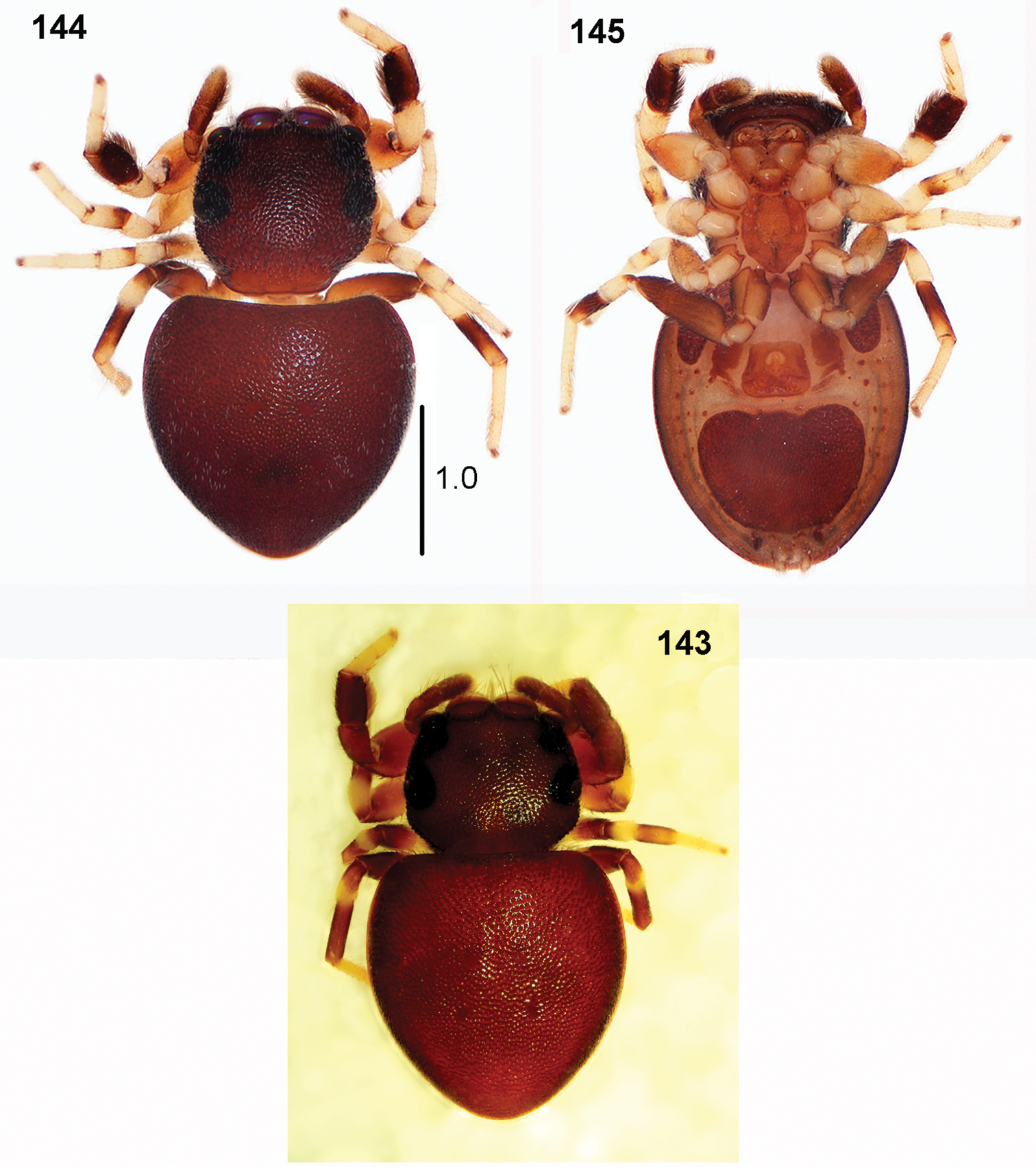
- Peplometus biscutellatus

Scientific classification
- Kingdom: Animalia
- Phylum: Arthropoda
- Subphylum: Chelicerata
- Class: Arachnida
- Order: Araneae
- Infraorder: Araneomorphae
- Family: Salticidae
- Subfamily: Salticinae
- Genus: Peplometus; Simon, 1900

Type species
- P. biscutellatus (Simon, 1887)

Species
- see text

= Peplometus =

Genus of spiders

Peplometus is a genus of African jumping spiders that was first described by Eugène Louis Simon in 1900. When he first established the genus, Simon assigned Peplometus to the Balleae group alongside the related genus Pachyballus. In their 2003 phylogenetic analysis, Wayne Maddison and Marshall Hedin noted that Pachyballus is closely related to Mantisatta, despite the large physiological differences between them, and the similarity of those spiders with a group of genera they termed Marpissoida but made no comment on Peplometus.

In 2015, Maddison listed Peplometus within the tribe Ballini, derived from Simon's original name for the related genus Ballus, but attributed to an earlier author, Nathan Banks from 1892. He allocated the tribe to the clade Marpissoida in the clade Salticoida. It is likely that the ballines diverged from the wider Marpissoida clade between 20 and 25 million years ago, although Daniela Andriamalala estimated the family to be 3.99 million years old. In 2016, Jerzy Prószyński added the genus to a group of genera termed Ballines, which contains many of the same genera, including Ballus and Pachyballus.

== Species ==
As of October 2025, this genus includes five species:

- Peplometus biscutellatus (Simon, 1887) – Guinea, Sierra Leone, Ivory Coast, Ghana, Togo, Nigeria, Cameroon (type species)
- Peplometus chlorophthalmus Simon, 1900 – DR Congo, South Africa
- Peplometus congoensis Wesołowska, Azarkina & Wiśniewski, 2020 – Congo, DR Congo
- Peplometus nimba Wesołowska, Azarkina & Wiśniewski, 2020 – Guinea
- Peplometus oyo (Wesołowska & Russell-Smith, 2011) – Nigeria
