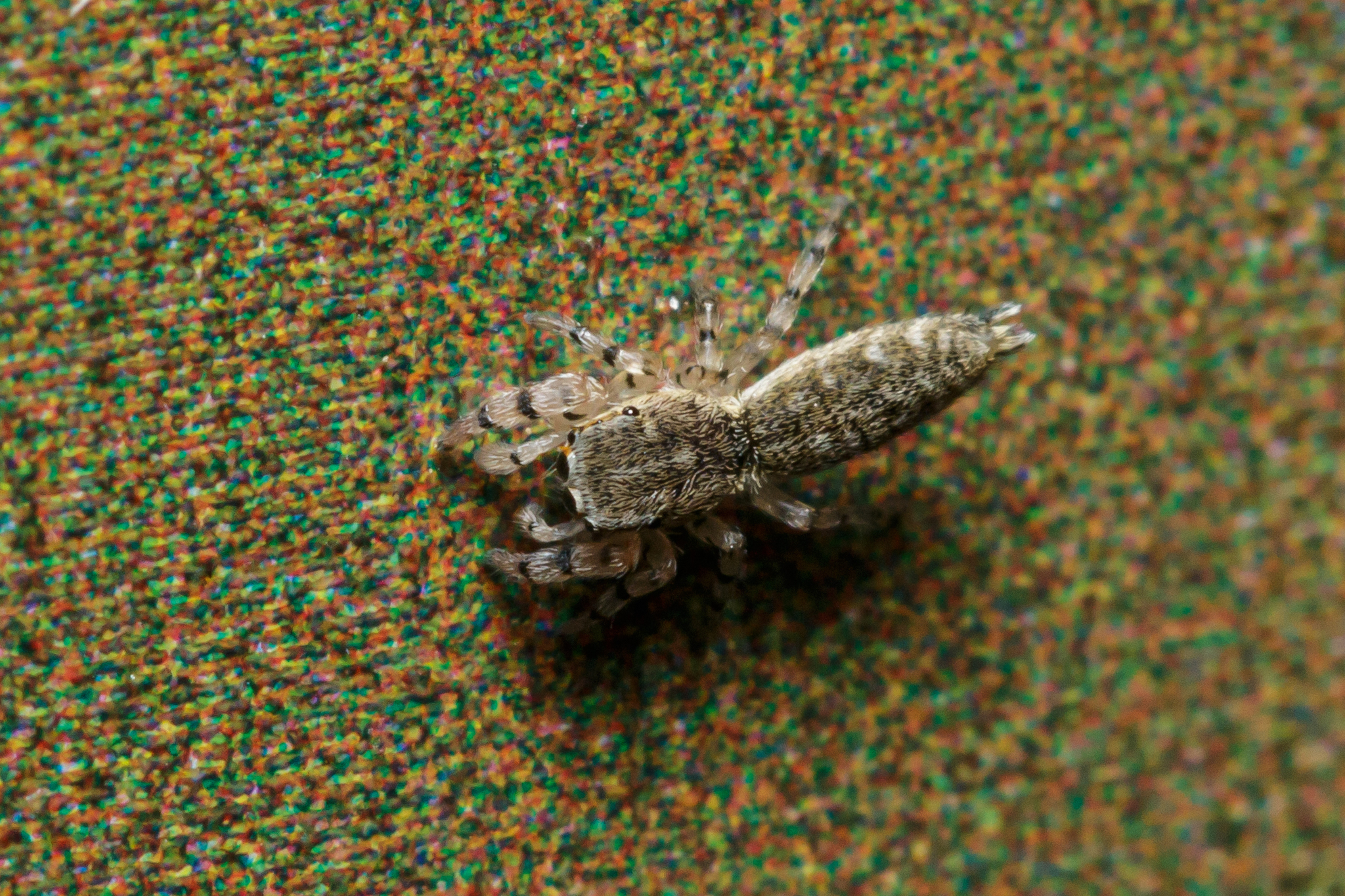
- Female from Texas
- Male (1848 drawing)

Scientific classification
- Kingdom: Animalia
- Phylum: Arthropoda
- Subphylum: Chelicerata
- Class: Arachnida
- Order: Araneae
- Infraorder: Araneomorphae
- Family: Salticidae
- Genus: Admestina
- Species: A. tibialis

Binomial name
- Admestina tibialis (C. L. Koch, 1846)

Synonyms
- Maevia tibialis C. L. Koch, 1846; Admestina wheeleri Banks, 1892

= Admestina tibialis =

Species of jumping spider

Admestina tibialis is a species of jumping spider of the genus Admestina. It is found in Canada and the United States.

== Etymology ==
The specific name tibialis refers to the enlarged tibia of the first leg, particularly in males, which is a distinguishing characteristic of this species.

== Distribution ==
A. tibialis is widely distributed across eastern North America, from New England south to North Carolina, west to Illinois and southwest to Texas. The species has been recorded from Canada and throughout much of the eastern and central United States.

== Habitat ==
The species has been found in coniferous forests, particularly among pines and spruces.

== Description ==
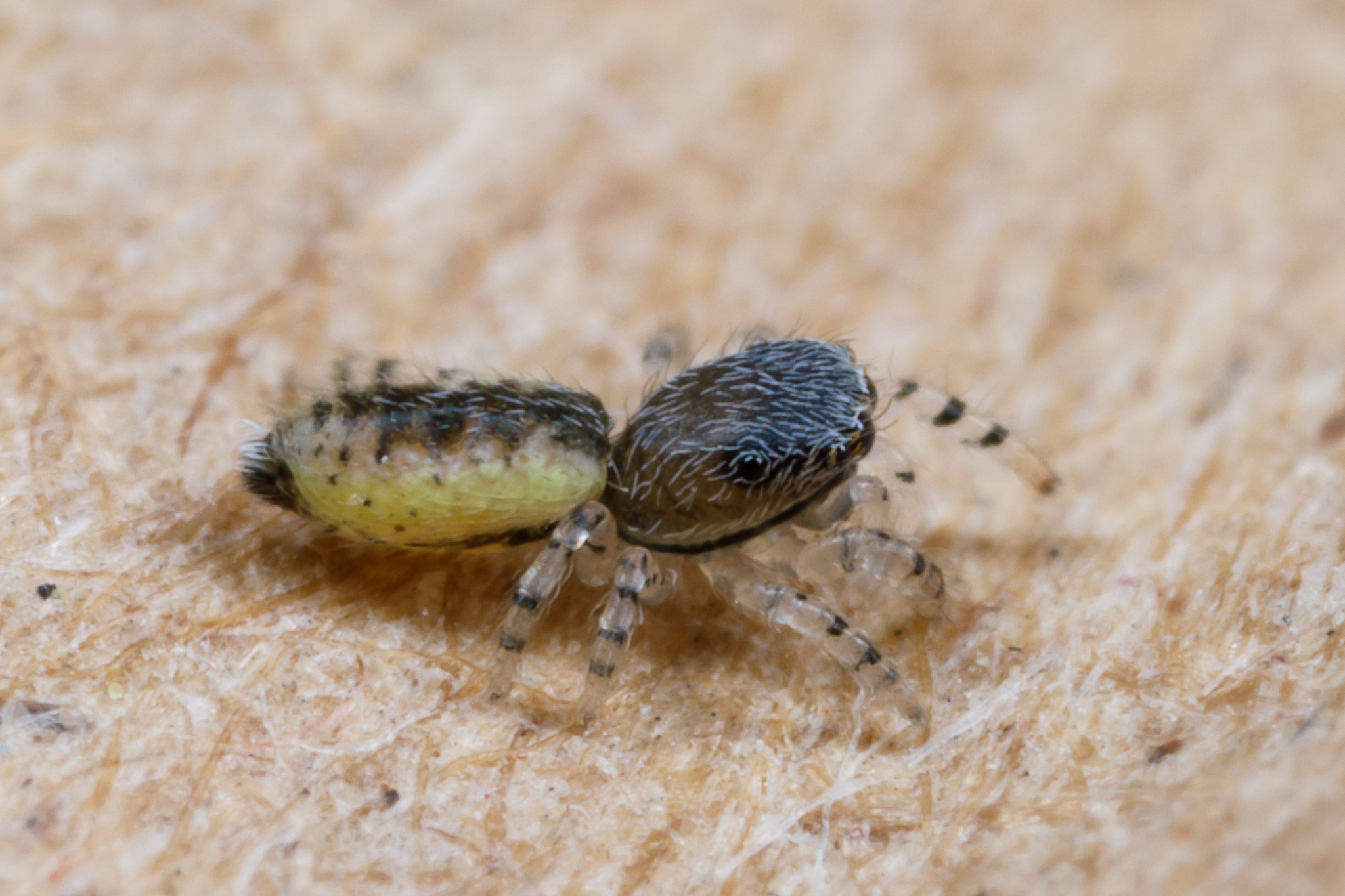
juvenile

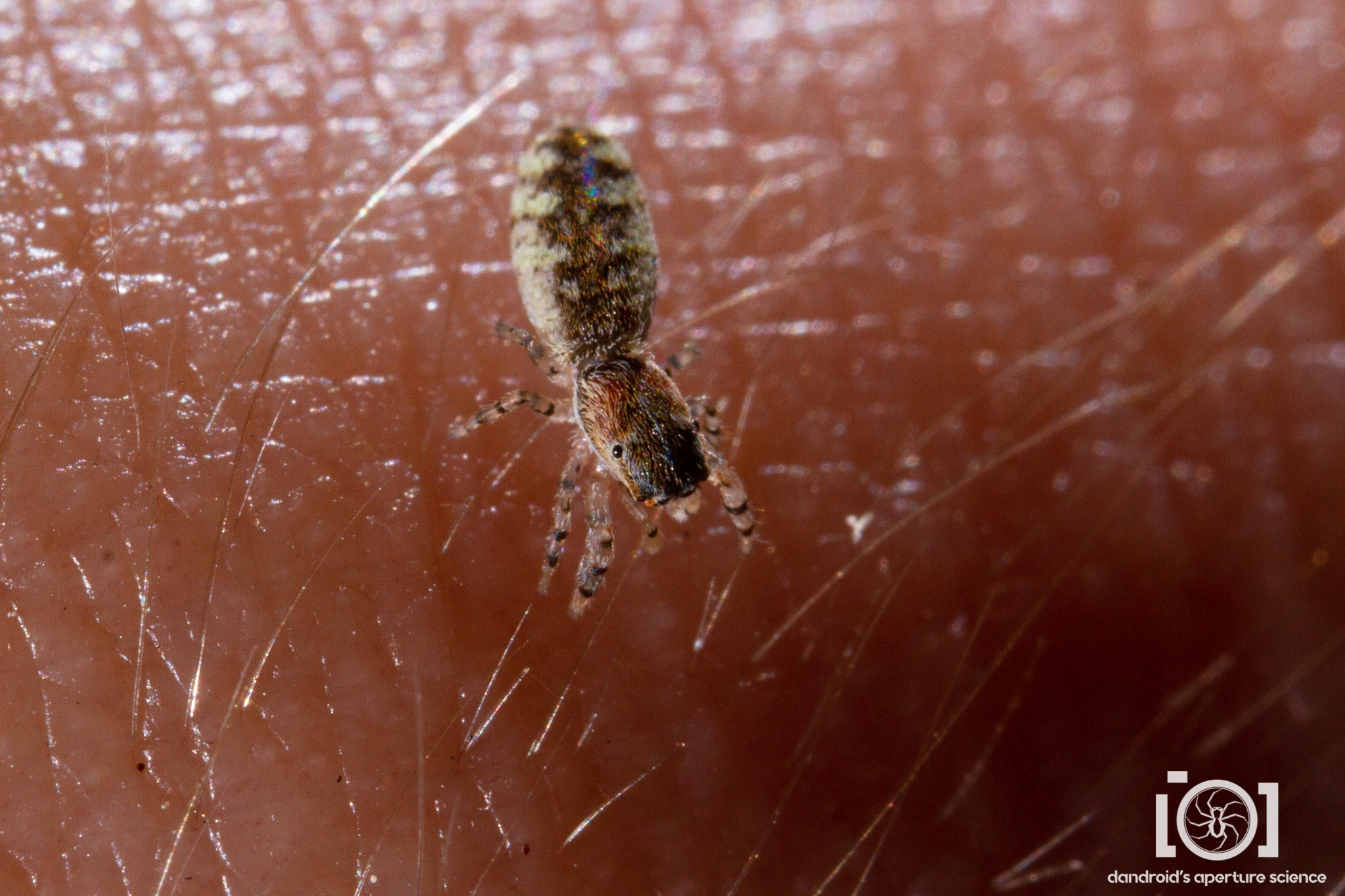
female on skin

Admestina tibialis is a small jumping spider with distinctive sexually dimorphic characteristics.

=== Females ===
Females are small spiders with the first leg pair having enlarged femur and tibia segments. The carapace is low and flat, nearly twice as long as wide, with the ocular region occupying about one third of the carapace length. The chelicerae have a fang groove with a single simple retromarginal tooth.

Females have first legs and palps essentially similar to males except that they are lighter in color, resembling the other legs.

=== Males ===
Males are approximately 3.25 mm in length with a leg formula of 4132, indicating that the fourth leg is longest and the second leg is shortest. The first pair of legs is notably thickened and enlarged compared to the other legs. The cephalothorax is longer than wide in a ratio of 59:37 and shows only slight swelling opposite the second legs. The eyes occupy slightly more than one third of the carapace length. The clypeus width is nearly equal to one third of the diameter of the anterior median eyes, which project considerably. The fang groove contains a single small retromarginal tooth and two small promarginal teeth. The male pedipalp has a strongly curved femur, a tibia with a single stout retrolateral apophysis, and a much swollen bulb with a short strongly curved embolus at the anterior end.

The coloration of males shows a cephalothorax that is generally dark mahogany brown, almost black in the eye region, overlaid with white hairs. The first pair of legs and palps are brownish, while the other legs are yellowish with dark annulations. The opisthosoma displays a broad lanceolate central dorsal brown stripe with six pairs of lateral extensions. Laterally, the abdomen is yellowish with many chalky white patches, and ventrally it is whitish with a broad central dusky stripe and a pair of ventrolateral broken narrow dusky stripes.
