= Peplometus biscutellatus =

Scientific classification
- Kingdom: Animalia
- Phylum: Arthropoda
- Subphylum: Chelicerata
- Class: Arachnida
- Order: Araneae
- Infraorder: Araneomorphae
- Family: Salticidae
- Genus: Peplometus
- Species: P. biscutellatus

Binomial name
- Peplometus biscutellatus (Simon, 1887)

Species of spider

Peplometus biscutellatus is a species of jumping spider that lives in Guinea, Sierra Leone, Ivory Coast, Ghana, Togo, Nigeria and Cameroon.
