= Attidops cinctipes =

Scientific classification
- Kingdom: Animalia
- Phylum: Arthropoda
- Subphylum: Chelicerata
- Class: Arachnida
- Order: Araneae
- Infraorder: Araneomorphae
- Family: Salticidae
- Genus: Attidops
- Species: A. cinctipes

Binomial name
- Attidops cinctipes (Banks, 1900)

Species of spider

Attidops cinctipes is a species of jumping spider in the family Salticidae. It is found in the United States and Mexico, around the Gulf of Mexico.

== Description ==
The species name cinctipes is derived from the Latin for "banded legs". Like other members of Attidops, it is considerably minute, with a body length of between two and three millimeters at maturity. It can be found on trees or woody surfaces, as its coloration allows it to camouflage against bark.
