= Attidops cutleri =

Scientific classification
- Kingdom: Animalia
- Phylum: Arthropoda
- Subphylum: Chelicerata
- Class: Arachnida
- Order: Araneae
- Infraorder: Araneomorphae
- Family: Salticidae
- Genus: Attidops
- Species: A. cutleri

Binomial name
- Attidops cutleri Edwards, 1999

Species of spider

Attidops cutleri is a species of jumping spider in the family Salticidae. It is found in the United States and Mexico.
