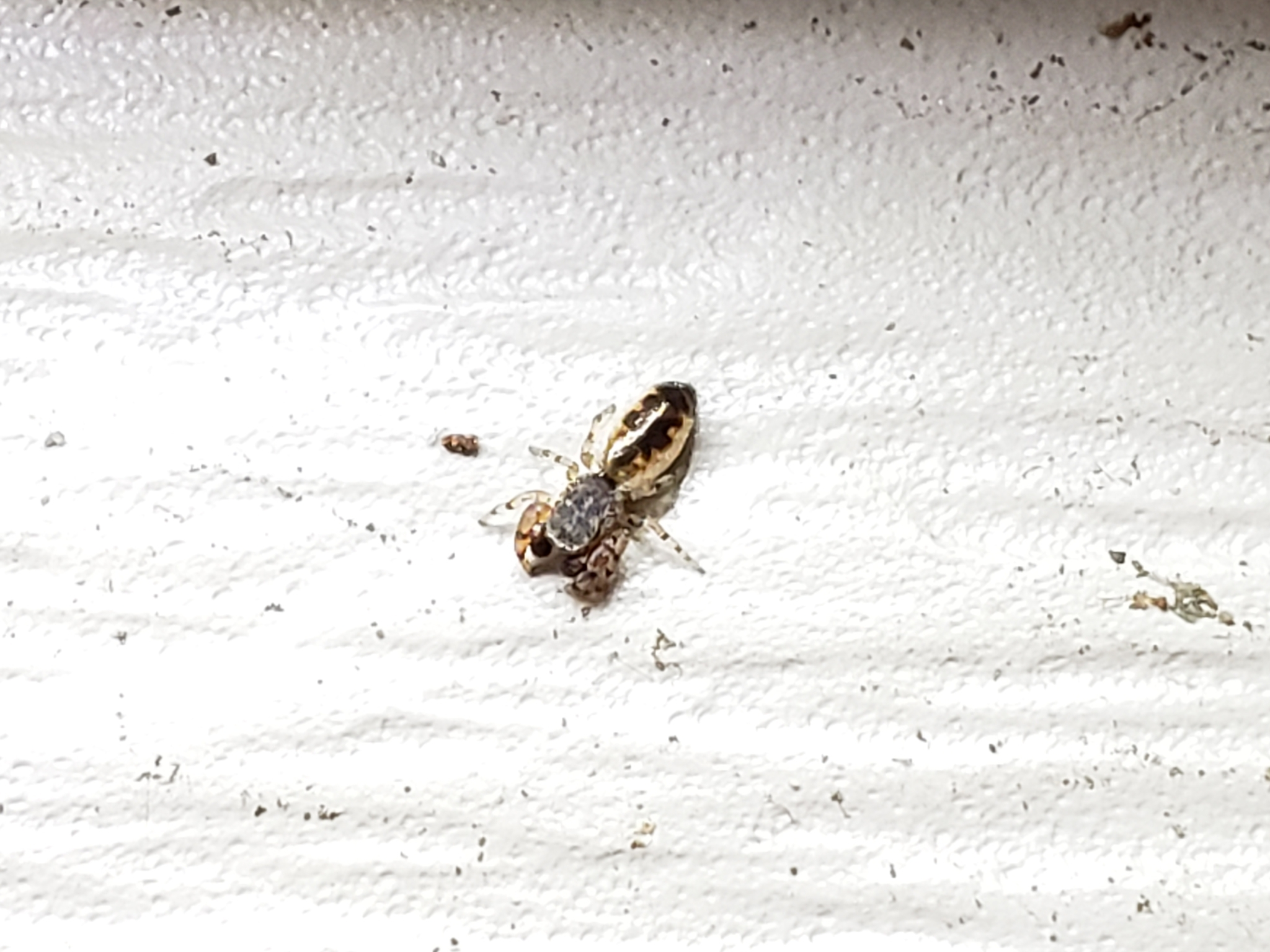

Scientific classification
- Kingdom: Animalia
- Phylum: Arthropoda
- Subphylum: Chelicerata
- Class: Arachnida
- Order: Araneae
- Infraorder: Araneomorphae
- Family: Salticidae
- Genus: Admestina
- Species: A. archboldi

Binomial name
- Admestina archboldi Piel, 1992

= Admestina archboldi =

Species of spider

Admestina archboldi is a species of jumping spider found in the southern United States. The species was first described in 1992 by William Piel.
