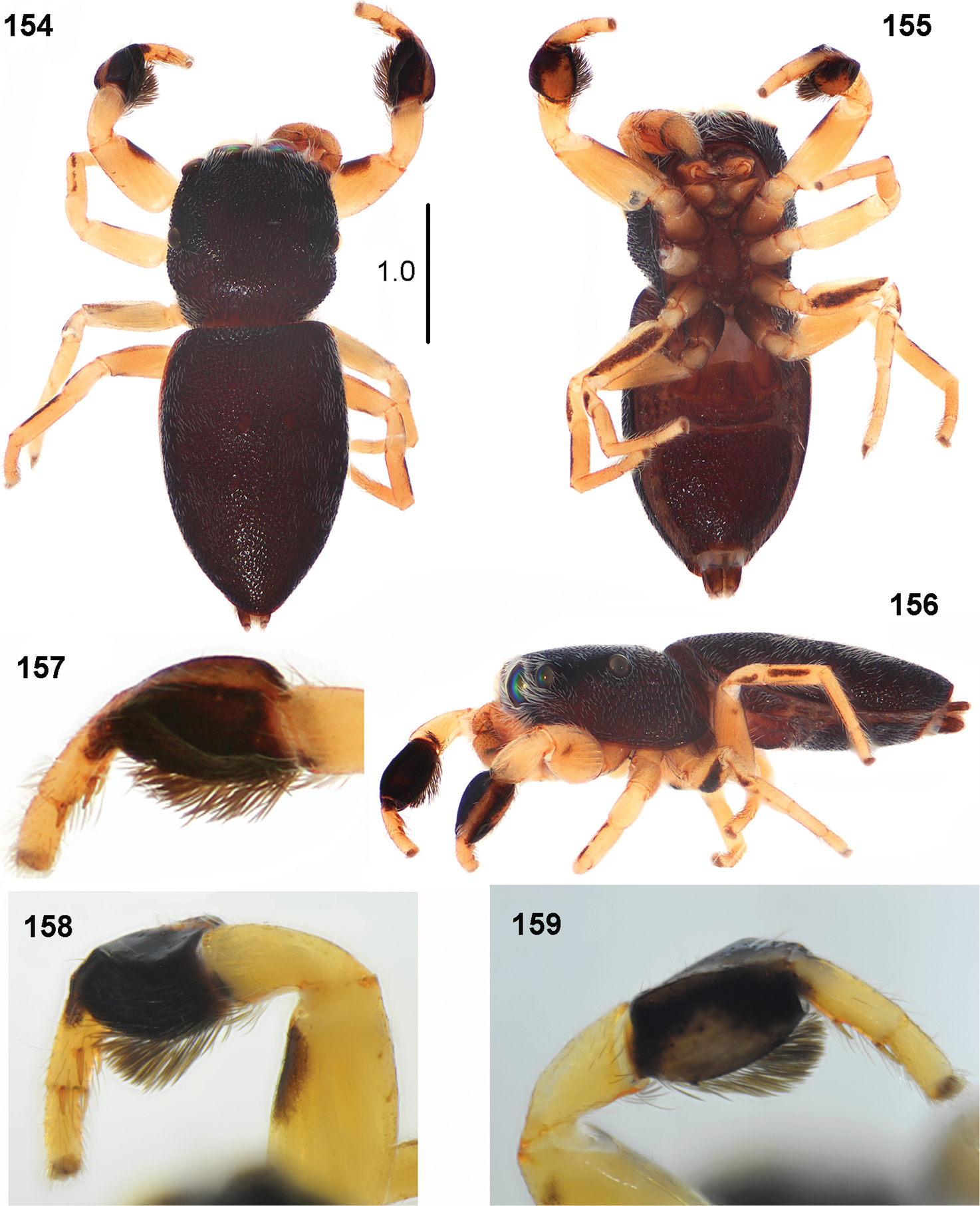

Scientific classification
- Kingdom: Animalia
- Phylum: Arthropoda
- Subphylum: Chelicerata
- Class: Arachnida
- Order: Araneae
- Infraorder: Araneomorphae
- Family: Salticidae
- Genus: Peplometus
- Species: P. chlorophthalmus

Binomial name
- Peplometus chlorophthalmus Simon, 1900

= Peplometus chlorophthalmus =

Species of spider

Peplometus chlorophthalmus is a species of jumping spider that lives in Congo and South Africa.
