= Admesturius schajovskoyi =

Scientific classification
- Kingdom: Animalia
- Phylum: Arthropoda
- Subphylum: Chelicerata
- Class: Arachnida
- Order: Araneae
- Infraorder: Araneomorphae
- Family: Salticidae
- Genus: Admesturius
- Species: A. schajovskoyi

Binomial name
- Admesturius schajovskoyi Galiano, 1988

Species of spider

Admesturius schajovskoyi is a species of spider classified as a family of the jumping spider. The scientific name of this species was first published in 1988 by Galianol. These spiders are commonly found in Argentina and Chile.
