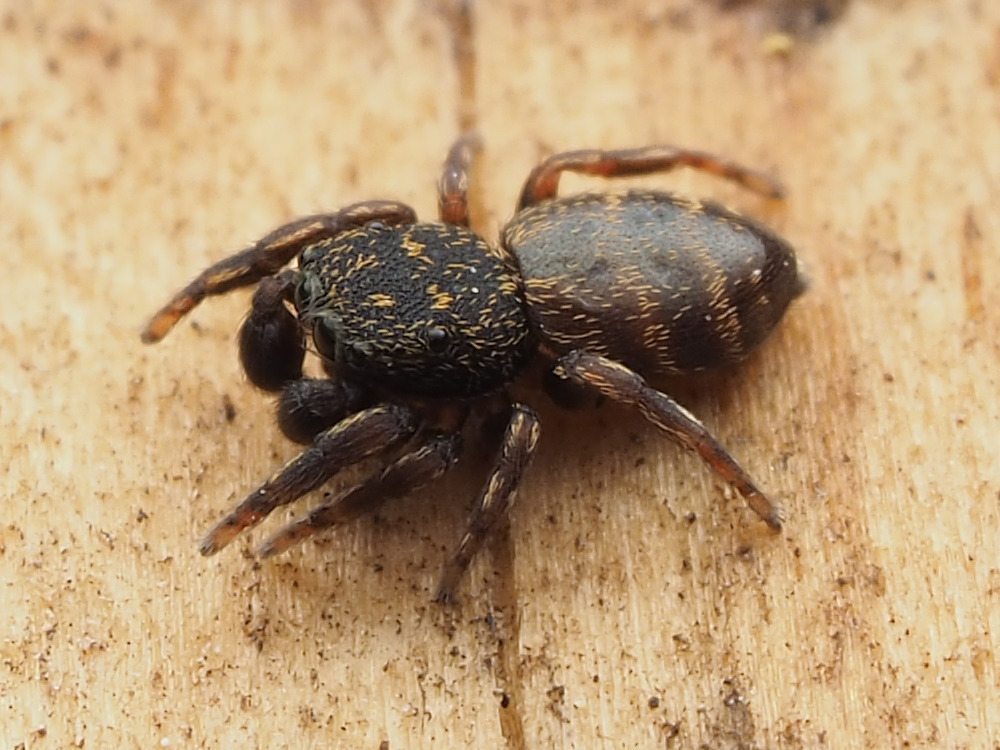
- Male in Pennsylvania

Scientific classification
- Kingdom: Animalia
- Phylum: Arthropoda
- Subphylum: Chelicerata
- Class: Arachnida
- Order: Araneae
- Infraorder: Araneomorphae
- Family: Salticidae
- Genus: Attidops
- Species: A. youngi

Binomial name
- Attidops youngi (Peckham & Peckham, 1888)

= Attidops youngi =

Species of spider

Attidops youngi is a species of jumping spider in the family Salticidae. It is found in the United States and Canada.
