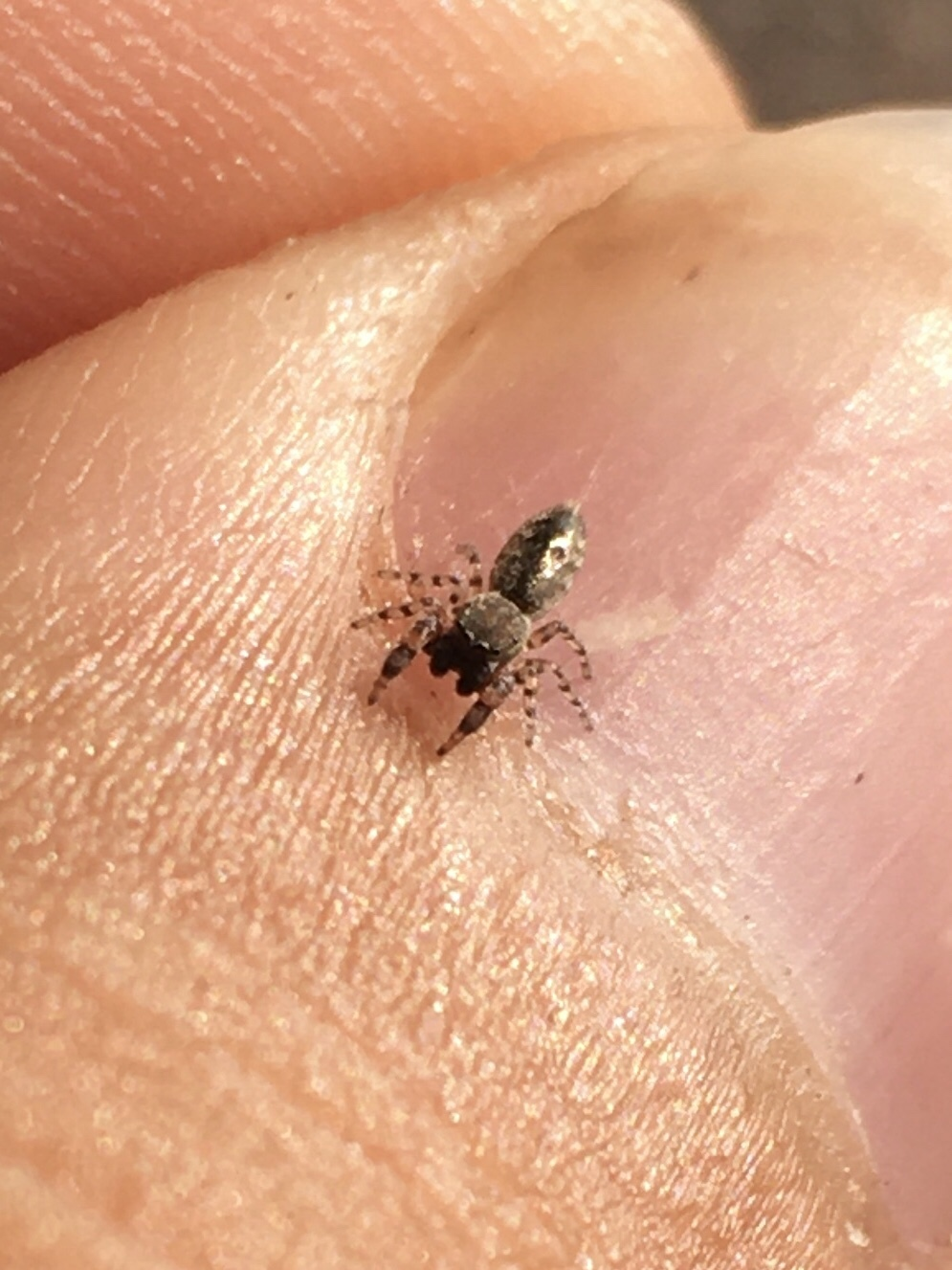

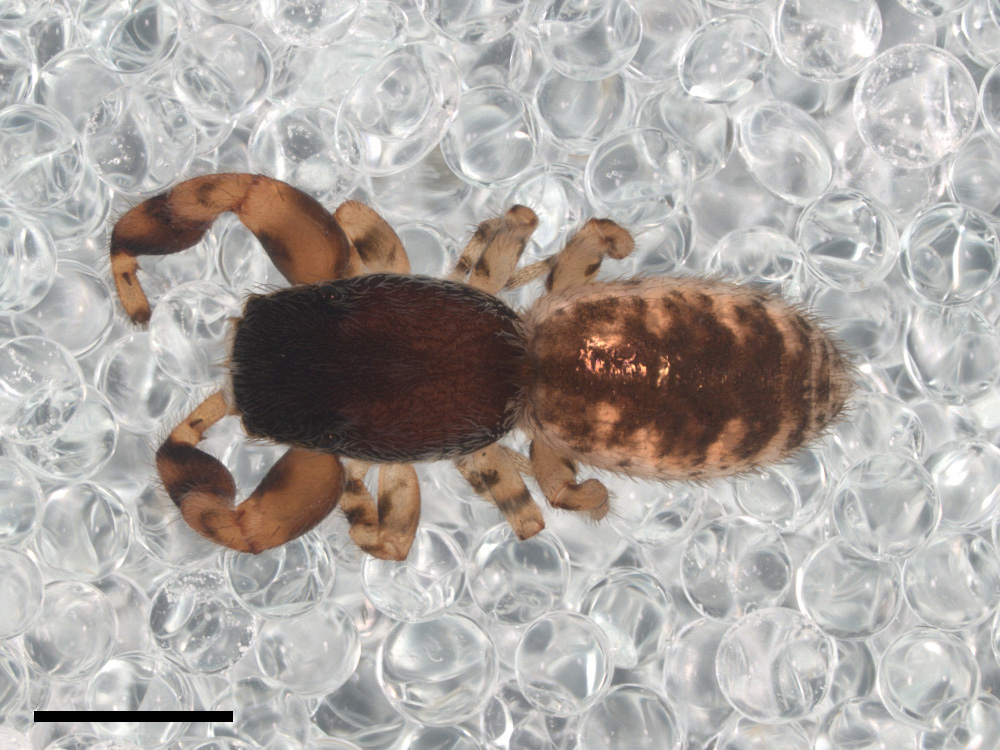

Scientific classification
- Kingdom: Animalia
- Phylum: Arthropoda
- Subphylum: Chelicerata
- Class: Arachnida
- Order: Araneae
- Infraorder: Araneomorphae
- Family: Salticidae
- Genus: Admestina
- Species: A. wheeleri

Binomial name
- Admestina wheeleri Peckham & Peckham, 1888

= Admestina wheeleri =

Thick-legged jumping spider

Species of spider

Admestina wheeleri, also known as the thick-legged jumping spider, is a species of jumping spider found in the northern United States and southern Canada.

The species was first described in 1888 by George and Elizabeth Peckham.
