= Admesturius =

Scientific classification
- Kingdom: Animalia
- Phylum: Arthropoda
- Subphylum: Chelicerata
- Class: Arachnida
- Order: Araneae
- Infraorder: Araneomorphae
- Family: Salticidae
- Subfamily: Salticinae
- Genus: Admesturius; Galiano, 1988

Type species
- A. schajovskoyi Galiano, 1988

Species
- A. bitaeniatus (Simon, 1901) – Chile; A. mariaeugeniae Bustamante & Scioscia, 2014 – Chile; A. schajovskoyi Galiano, 1988 – Chile, Argentina

Genus of spiders

Admesturius is a genus of South American jumping spiders that was first described by María Elena Galiano in 1988. As of June 2019 it contains only three species, found only in Argentina and Chile: A. bitaeniatus, A. mariaeugeniae, and A. schajovskoyi.
