= Admesturius bitaeniatus =

Scientific classification
- Kingdom: Animalia
- Phylum: Arthropoda
- Subphylum: Chelicerata
- Class: Arachnida
- Order: Araneae
- Infraorder: Araneomorphae
- Family: Salticidae
- Genus: Admesturius
- Species: A. bitaeniatus

Binomial name
- Admesturius bitaeniatus Simon, 1901

Species of spider

Admesturius bitaeniatus is a species of jumping spider found in Chile. The species was first described in 1901 by Eugène Simon.
