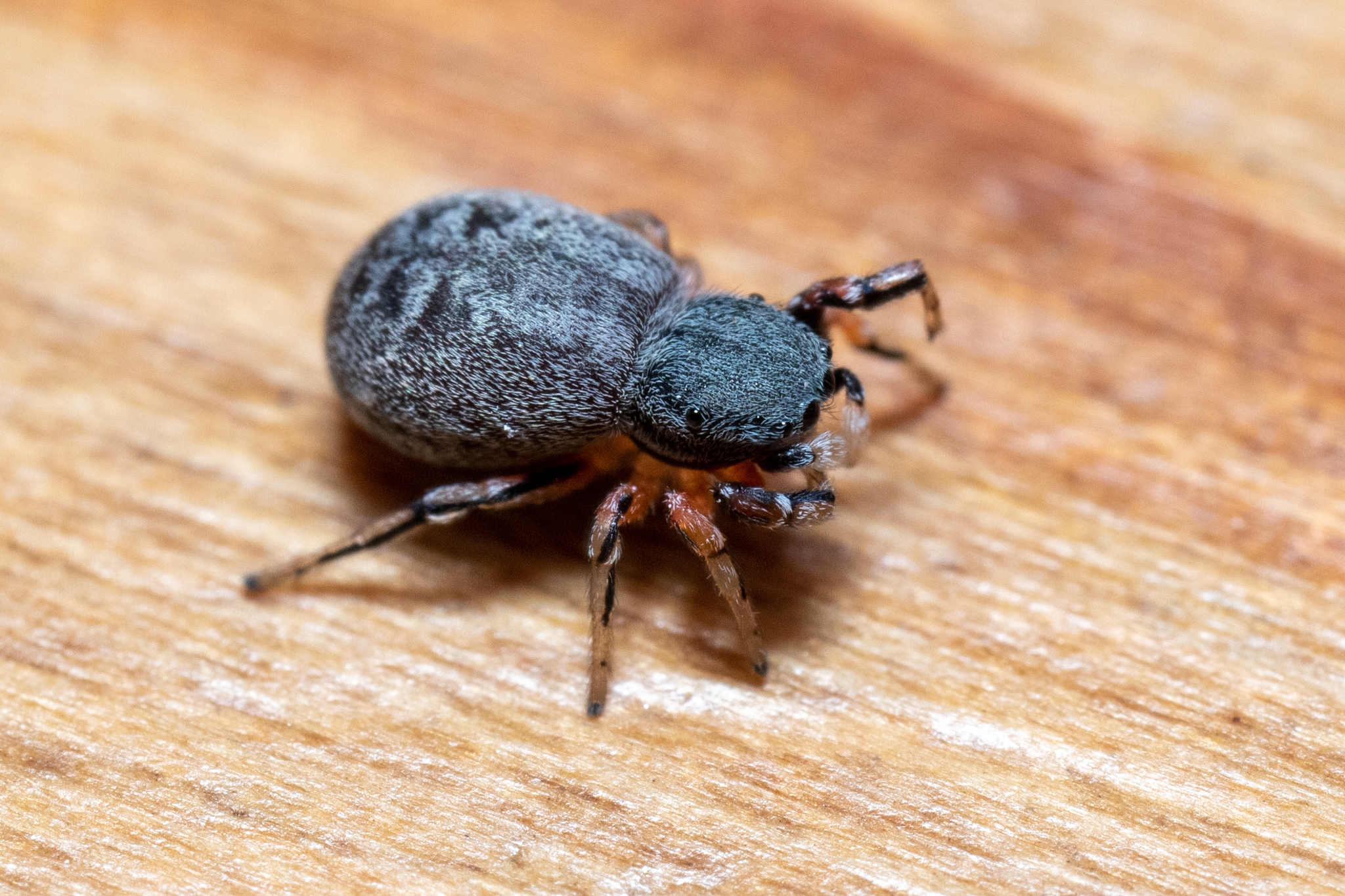
- female from France
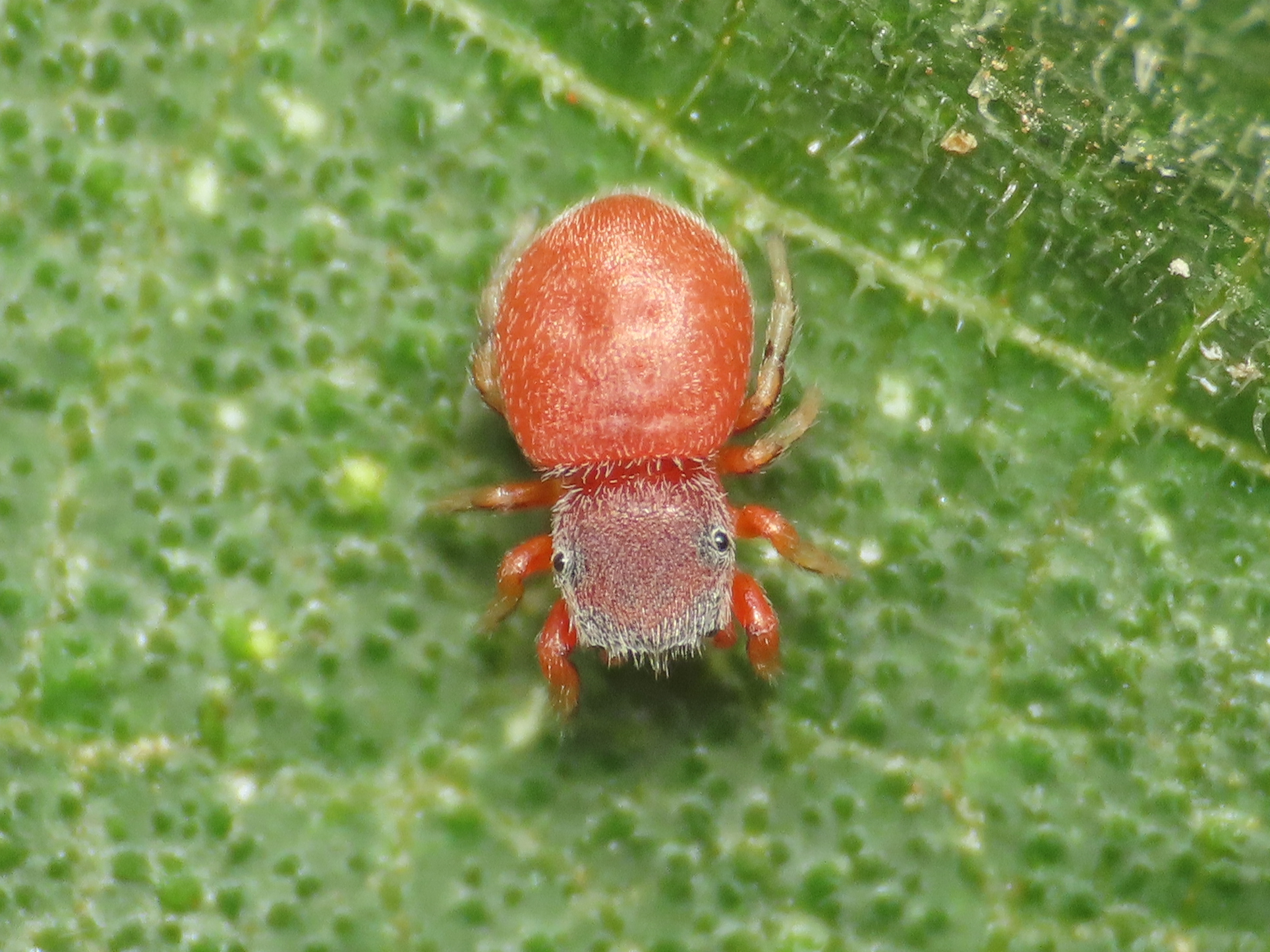
- juvenile

Scientific classification
- Kingdom: Animalia
- Phylum: Arthropoda
- Subphylum: Chelicerata
- Class: Arachnida
- Order: Araneae
- Infraorder: Araneomorphae
- Family: Salticidae
- Genus: Ballus
- Species: B. rufipes

Binomial name
- Ballus rufipes (Simon, 1868)

Synonyms
- Attus rufipes Simon, 1868; Ballus depressus poecilopus Bertkau, in Förster & Bertkau, 1883

= Ballus rufipes =

Species of spider

Ballus rufipes is a species of jumping spider in the genus Ballus. It is found across Europe, Turkey, Armenia, Cyprus, and North Africa.

== Etymology ==
The species name rufipes derives from Latin rufus (red) and pes (foot), referring to the reddish coloration of the legs.

== Distribution ==
B. rufipes has been recorded from Europe, Turkey, Armenia, Cyprus, and North Africa. Within Europe, it has been documented from various countries including Greece, Hungary, Switzerland, and the Rheinland region of Germany.

== Description ==
Ballus rufipes is a small jumping spider measuring approximately 3.5 mm in length.

=== Female ===
The female has a black and velvety body. The red legs have swollen front segments with black feet. The cephalothorax is narrower than in related species, with the head slightly shorter than the thorax. Both are noticeably constricted. The face is slightly narrower with rounded corners, and the eyes are similar to related species. The median eyes are equally brilliant green. The integument of the cephalothorax is finely shagreened, black, and covered with gray down.

The opisthosoma is somewhat truncated at the front and pointed at the rear, appearing blackish-blue and velvety. The underside and sternum match the dorsal coloration. The chelicerae are dark brown with the last segment black. The front legs are bright red and more swollen than in related species. The second segment of the leg, which has the form of a club, is black and bristled with stiff hairs. The other legs are thin and bright orange-red. The two leg segments each present a small black longitudinal line on the outer side. All tarsi are yellow.

=== Male ===
The male has a head the same length as the thorax and is wider than the female at the level of the posterior eyes. It narrows forward, and the thorax is also attenuated and rounded at the rear. The integument is black, strongly granular, and decorated with white down. At the front it presents a slightly reddish tint. The chelicerae are brown with the last two segments somewhat dilated and yellow.

The front legs are relatively much less thick than in the female. All legs are reddish-yellow and bear a black line on the internal face of the leg. On the first four segments this line exists only on the second segment. On the others it extends over both segments, and the fourth even presents a large black spot at the base of the second segment.

== Habitat ==
Ballus rufipes has been found living in snail shells, suggesting a preference for small, enclosed spaces. The species seems to be found on the ground and in the lower shrub layer.
