= Porius =

Scientific classification
- Kingdom: Animalia
- Phylum: Arthropoda
- Subphylum: Chelicerata
- Class: Arachnida
- Order: Araneae
- Infraorder: Araneomorphae
- Family: Salticidae
- Subfamily: Salticinae
- Genus: Porius; Thorell, 1892

Type species
- P. papuanus (Thorell, 1881)

Species
- P. decempunctatus (Szombathy, 1915) – New Guinea; P. papuanus (Thorell, 1881) – New Guinea

Genus of spiders

Porius is a genus of Papuan jumping spiders that was first described by Tamerlan Thorell in 1892. As of August 2019 it contains only two species, found only in Papua New Guinea: P. decempunctatus and P. papuanus.
