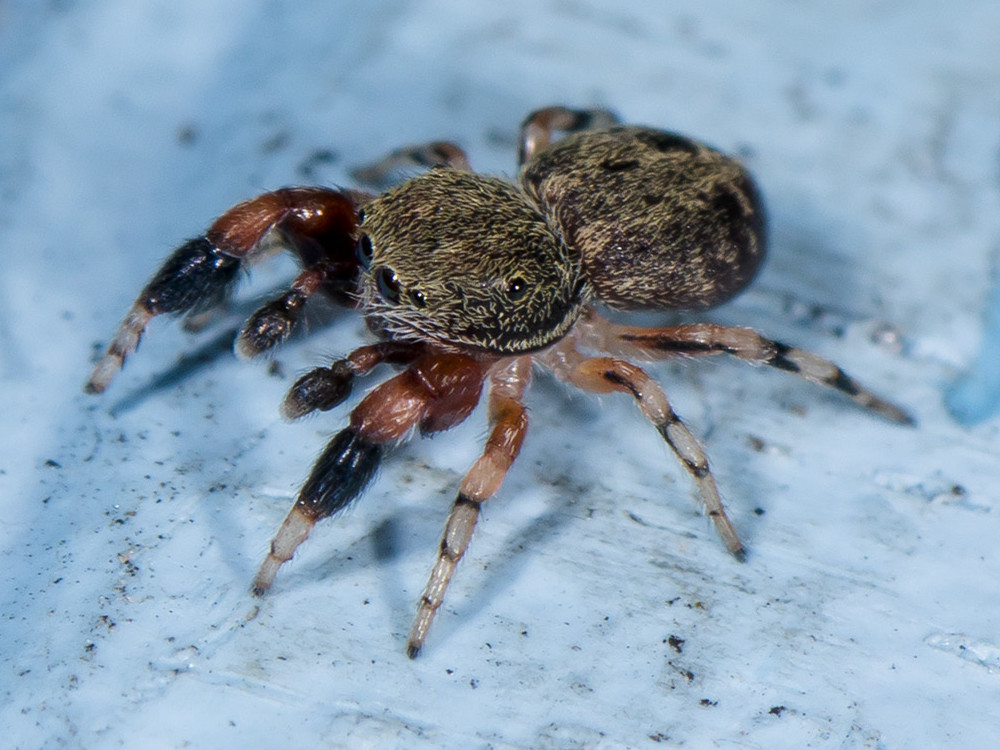
- Male B. chalybeius

Scientific classification
- Kingdom: Animalia
- Phylum: Arthropoda
- Subphylum: Chelicerata
- Class: Arachnida
- Order: Araneae
- Infraorder: Araneomorphae
- Family: Salticidae
- Subfamily: Salticinae
- Genus: Ballus; C. L. Koch, 1850

Type species
- Salticus heterophthalmus Wider, 1834

Species
- See text.

= Ballus =

Genus of spiders

Ballus is a spider genus of the family Salticidae (jumping spiders).

== Description ==
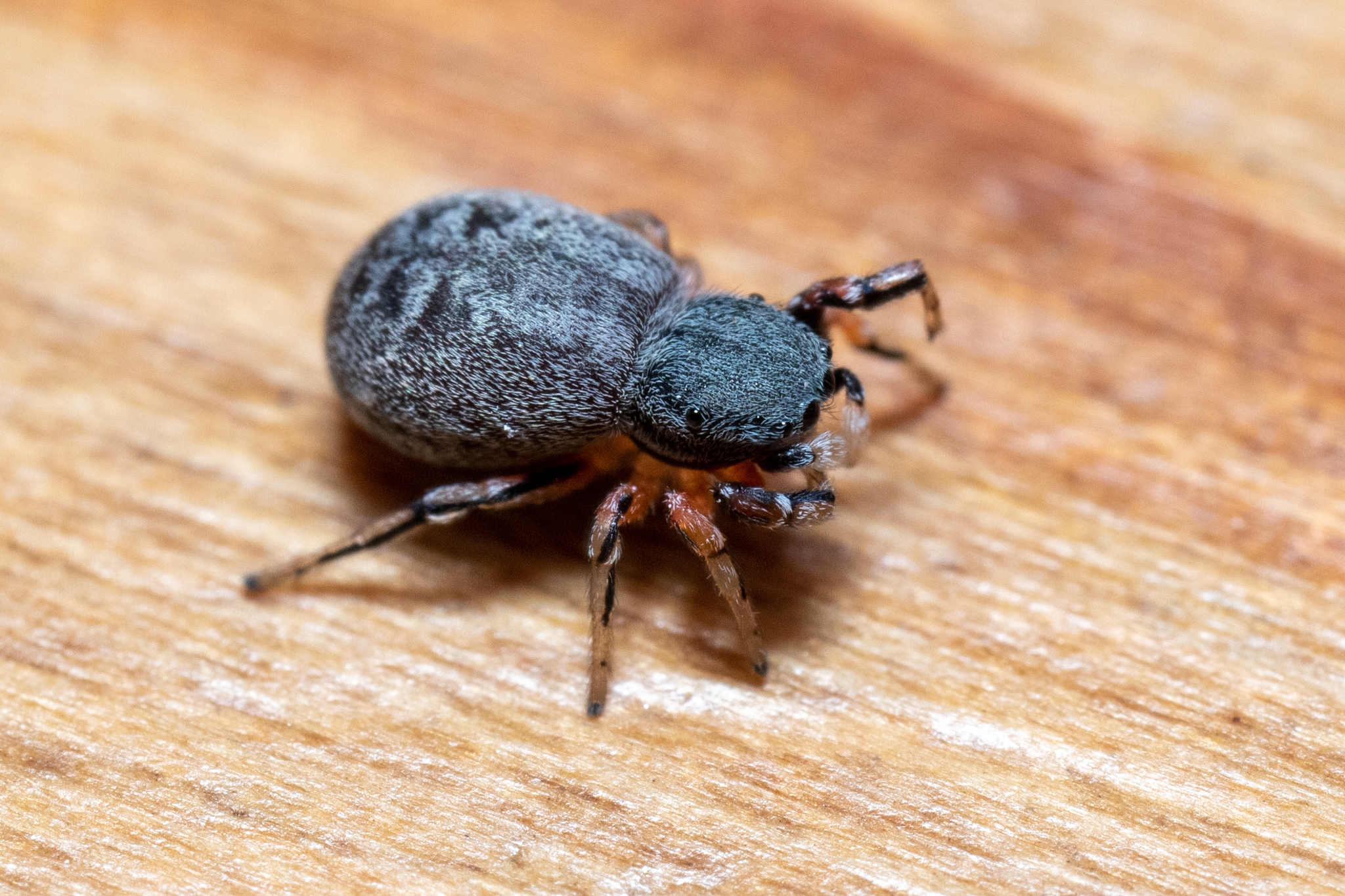
female B. rufipes from France

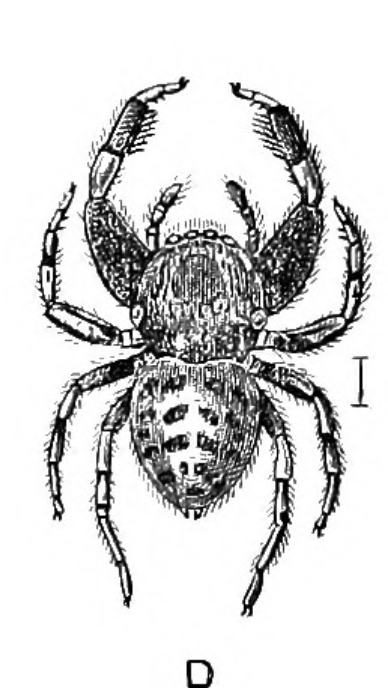
Drawing of B. variegatus (1895)

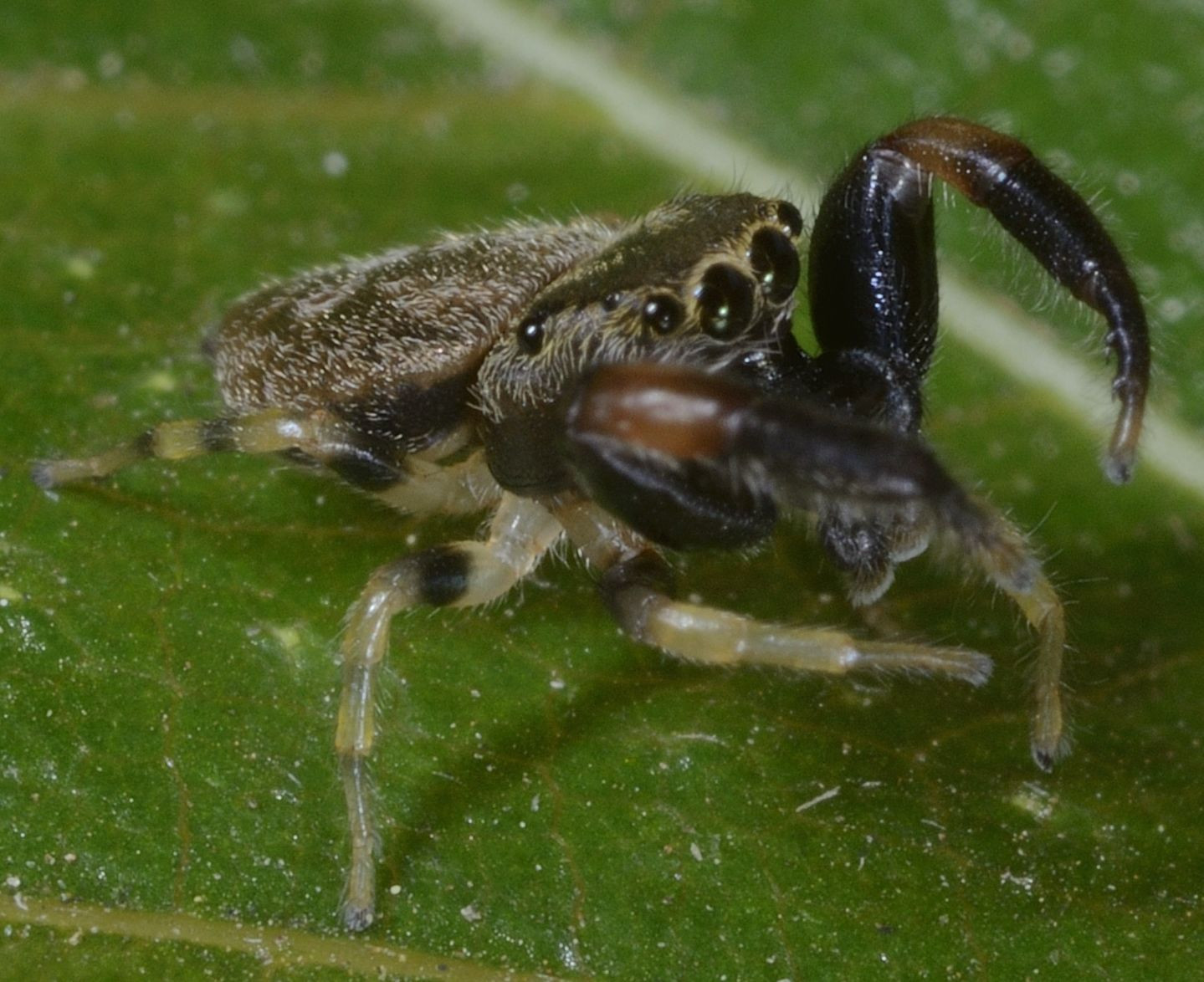
female B. segmentatus

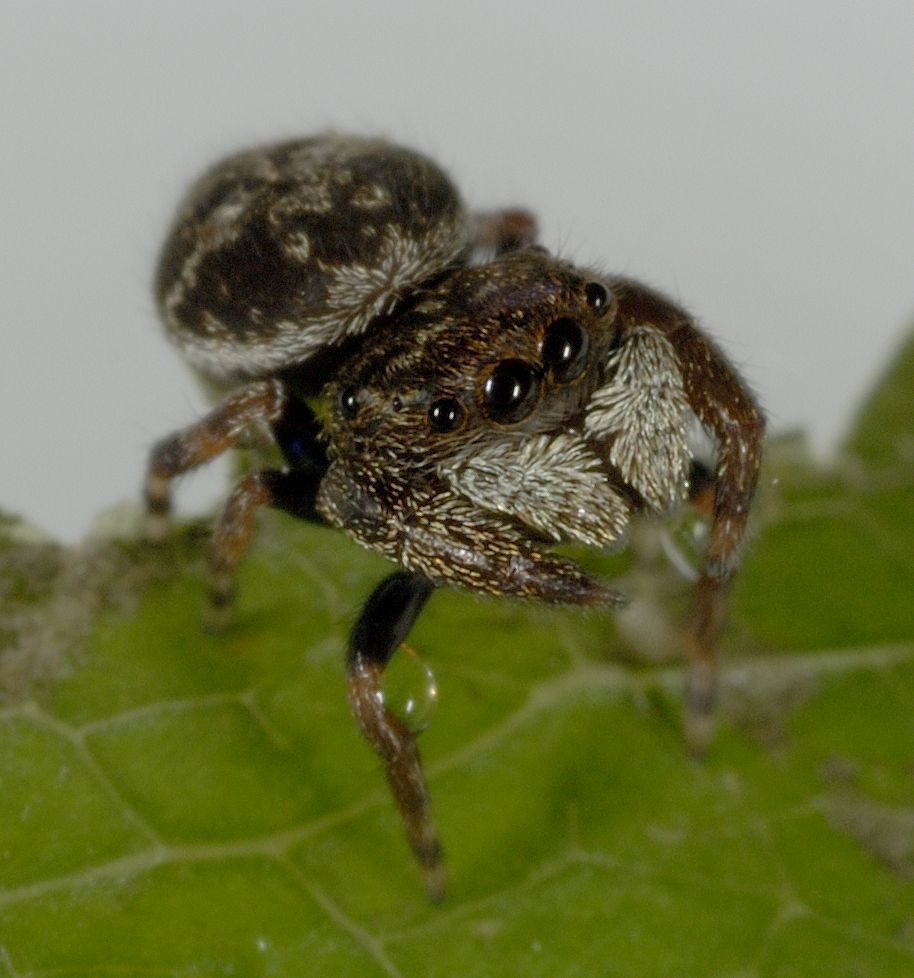
male B. segmentatus

Ballus are typically small, squat spiders. The carapace is broad oval, almost as wide as long, flat on top with the sides and back almost vertical, and a rugose surface. The shield-shaped opisthosoma is broadly truncated at the front.

In males, the femora, patellae and tibiae on the first pair of legs are swollen, and there is a fringe below the tibiae. Although they are often entirely mottled dark brown, some species are much more colorful.

== Distribution ==
This genus has mainly a Palearctic distribution, extending from Europe and North Africa to Central Asia. There are two species from Sri Lanka, and one species recorded from Japan. One species was described from Myanmar, though its taxonomic status remains uncertain.

Several species formerly placed in Ballus have been transferred to other genera. Ballus cinctipes and Ballus youngi have been moved to Attidops, Ballus decempunctatus to Porius, and Ballus planus to Rhene.

== Species ==
As of 2025, the genus contains seven valid species:

- Ballus armadillo (Simon, 1871) – France (Corsica), Italy, Malta
- Ballus chalybeius (Walckenaer, 1802) – Europe, North Africa to Central Asia
- Ballus japonicus Saito, 1939 – Japan
- Ballus piger O. Pickard-Cambridge, 1876 – Egypt
- Ballus rufipes (Simon, 1868) – Europe, Turkey, Armenia, Cyprus, North Africa
- Ballus segmentatus Simon, 1900 – Sri Lanka
- Ballus tabupumensis Petrunkevitch, 1914 – Myanmar
- Ballus variegatus Simon, 1876 – Portugal to Italy

== Taxonomic notes ==
Several names previously associated with Ballus are now considered synonyms or have been transferred. Ballus sellatus Simon, 1900 is now considered a junior synonym of B. segmentatus.

A number of names are considered nomina dubia due to insufficient original descriptions: B. lendli, B. obscuroides, B. sociabilis, and B. vulpinus.
