= List of Ischnothelidae species =

This page lists all described species of the spider family Ischnothelidae accepted by the World Spider Catalog as of January 2021:

== Andethele ==
Andethele Coyle, 1995

- A. huanca Coyle, 1995 (type) — Peru
- A. lucma Coyle, 1995 — Peru
- A. tarma Coyle, 1995 — Peru

== Indothele ==
Indothele Coyle, 1995

- I. dumicola (Pocock, 1900) (type) — India
- I. lanka Coyle, 1995 — Sri Lanka
- I. mala Coyle, 1995 — India
- I. rothi Coyle, 1995 — India

== Ischnothele ==
Ischnothele

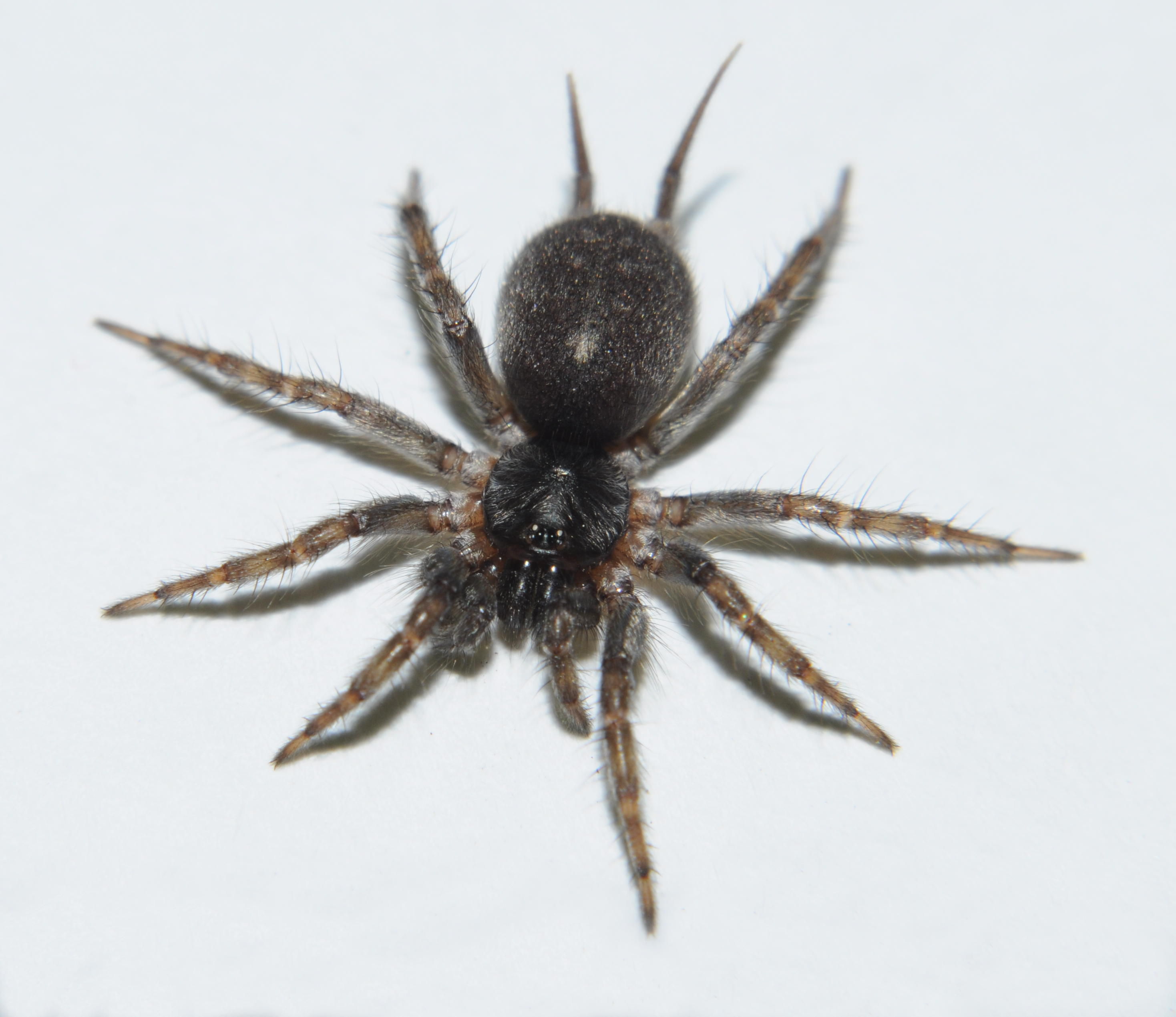
Ischnothele caudata

Ischnothele Ausserer, 1875

- I. annulata Tullgren, 1905 — Brazil, Bolivia, Paraguay, Argentina
- I. caudata Ausserer, 1875 (type) — Mexico to Brazil
- I. digitata (O. Pickard-Cambridge, 1892) — Mexico to El Salvador
- I. garcia Coyle, 1995 — Hispaniola
- I. goloboffi Coyle, 1995 — Peru
- I. guianensis (Walckenaer, 1837) — Peru to Guyana
- I. huambisa Coyle, 1995 — Peru
- I. indicola Tikader, 1969 — India
- I. jeremie Coyle, 1995 — Hispaniola
- I. longicauda Franganillo, 1930 — Bahama Is., Cuba
- I. reggae Coyle & Meigs, 1990 — Jamaica
- I. xera Coyle & Meigs, 1990 — Jamaica

== Lathrothele ==
Lathrothele Benoit, 1965

- L. catamita (Simon, 1907) — São Tomé and Príncipe
- L. cavernicola Benoit, 1965 — Congo
- L. grabensis Benoit, 1965 (type) — Cameroon, Congo, Rwanda, Burundi
- L. jezequeli Benoit, 1965 — Ivory Coast
- L. mitonae Bäckstam, Drolshagen & Seiter, 2013 — Gabon

== Thelechoris ==
Thelechoris Karsch, 1881

- T. rutenbergi Karsch, 1881 (type) — Madagascar
- T. striatipes (Simon, 1889) — East, Southern Africa, Madagascar
