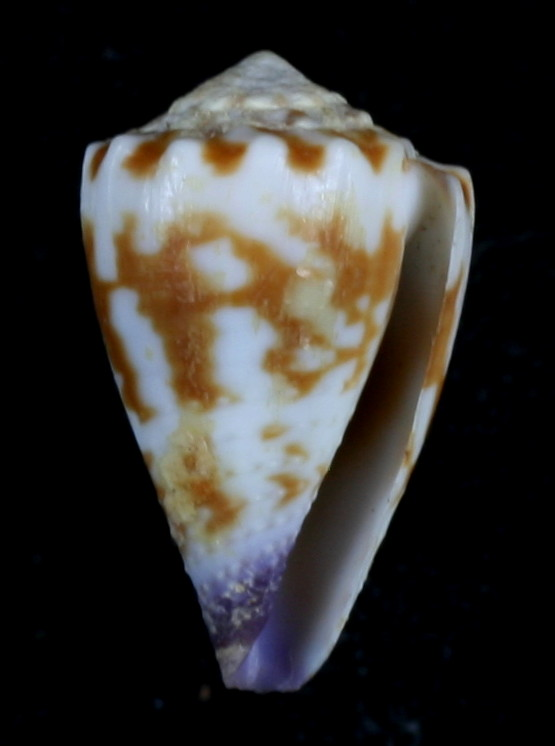
- Apertural view of shell of Conus nux Broderip, 1833, measuring 21.3 mm in height, collected at low tide in San Carlos Bay, Mexico

Scientific classification
- Kingdom: Animalia
- Phylum: Mollusca
- Class: Gastropoda
- Subclass: Caenogastropoda
- Order: Neogastropoda
- Family: Conidae
- Genus: Conus
- Subgenus: Harmoniconus da Motta, 1991

Type species
- Conus musicus Hwass in Bruguière, 1792

Synonyms
- Dendroconus (Harmoniconus) da Motta, 1991; Harmoniconus da Motta, 1991

= Conus (Harmoniconus) =

Subgenus of gastropods

Harmoniconus is a subgenus of sea snails, marine gastropod mollusks in the family Conidae, the cone snails and their allies.

In the new classification of the family Conidae by Puillandre N., Duda T.F., Meyer C., Olivera B.M. & Bouchet P. (2015), Harmoniconus has become a subgenus of Conus: Conus (Harmoniconus) da Motta, 1991 (type species: Conus musicus Hwass in Bruguière, 1792) represented as Conus Thiele, 1929

== Distinguishing characteristics ==
The Tucker & Tenorio 2009 taxonomy distinguishes Harmoniconus from Conus in the following ways:

- Genus Conus sensu stricto Linnaeus, 1758

Shell characters (living and fossil species)

The basic shell shape is conical to elongated conical, has a deep anal notch on the shoulder, a smooth periostracum and a small operculum. The shoulder of the shell is usually nodulose and the protoconch is usually multispiral. Markings often include the presence of tents except for black or white color variants, with the absence of spiral lines of minute tents and textile bars.

Radular tooth (not known for fossil species)

The radula has an elongated anterior section with serrations and a large exposed terminating cusp, a non-obvious waist, blade is either small or absent and has a short barb, and lacks a basal spur.

Geographical distribution

These species are found in the Indo-Pacific region.

Feeding habits

These species eat other gastropods including cones.

- Subgenus Harmoniconus da Motta, 1991

Shell characters (living and fossil species)

The shell is turgid in shape with a low domed spire. The protoconch is multispiral. The anal notch is shallow. The shell does not have an anterior notch. The shell is either smooth or ornamented with rows of pustules. The periostracum is smooth, and the operculum is moderate to large.

Radular tooth (not known for fossil species)

The anterior section of the radular tooth is shorter than the length of the posterior section, and the blade is long and covers the length of the anterior section. A basal spur is present, the barb is short, and the posterior fold and/or terminating cusp are partially external.

Geographical distribution

The species in this genus occur in the Indo-Pacific region, and one species (H. nux) occurs in the Eastern Pacific region.

Feeding habits

These cone snails are vermivorous, meaning that the cones prey on polychaete, Eunicidae and Nereididae worms.

== Species list ==
This list of species is based on the information in the World Register of Marine Species (WoRMS) list. Species within the genus Harmoniconus include:

The following species names are recognized as "alternate representations" (see full explanation below) in contrast to the traditional system, which uses the genus Conus for all species in the family:

- Harmoniconus mcbridei (Lorenz, 2005): synonym of Conus mcbridei Lorenz, 2005
- Harmoniconus musicus (Hwass in Bruguière, 1792): synonym of Conus musicus Hwass in Bruguière, 1792
- Harmoniconus nanus (G.B. Sowerby I, 1833): synonym of Conus nanus G.B. Sowerby I, 1833
- Harmoniconus nux (Broderip, 1833): synonym of Conus nux Broderip, 1833
- Harmoniconus parvatus (Walls, 1979): synonym of Conus parvatus Walls, 1979
- Harmoniconus paukstisi Tucker, Tenorio & Chaney, 2011: synonym of Conus (Harmoniconus) paukstisi (Tucker, Tenorio & Chaney, 2011) represented as Conus paukstisi (Tucker, Tenorio & Chaney, 2011)
- Harmoniconus sponsalis (Hwass in Bruguière, 1792): synonym of Conus sponsalis Hwass in Bruguière, 1792
