= Harmonicon =

Harmonicon may refer to:

== Music ==
- The Harmonicon, a London musical magazine 1823–33
- Panharmonicon, an organ-like musical instrument
- Harmonica, a handheld wind instrument
- A small pipe organ with a true keyed Glass harmonica, created by Wilhelm Christian Müller
- A large strung keyboard instrument blending a piano and a harpsichord, played vis-a-vis (and such called) by two players
- Xylophone, a wooden percussion instrument

== Other ==
- Harmonicon (spider), a genus in the spider family Dipluridae
- Harmoniconus, a subgenus of sea snails

== See also ==
- Harmonic (disambiguation)
