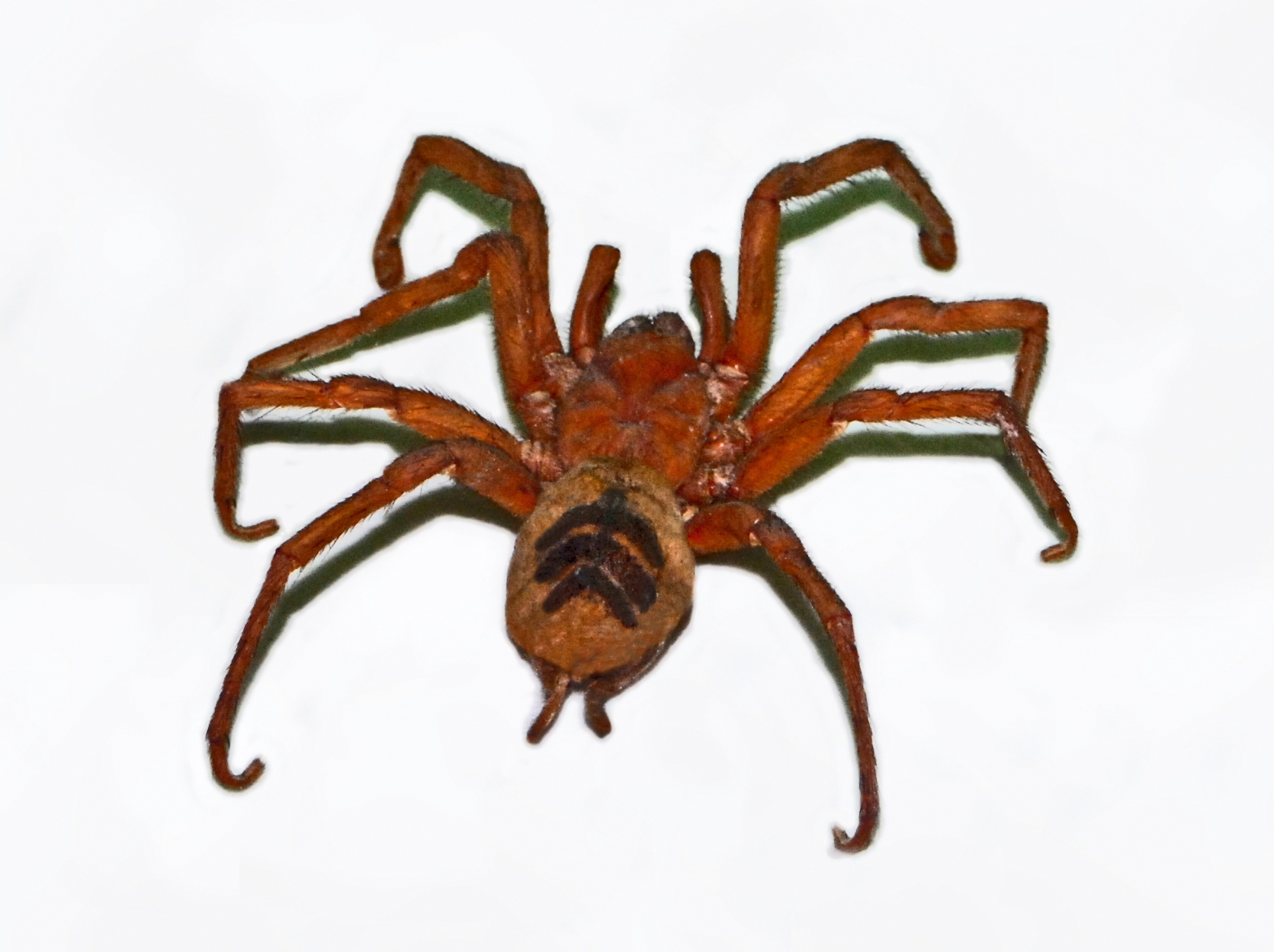
- From Brazil

Scientific classification
- Domain: Eukaryota
- Kingdom: Animalia
- Phylum: Arthropoda
- Subphylum: Chelicerata
- Class: Arachnida
- Order: Araneae
- Infraorder: Mygalomorphae
- Family: Dipluridae
- Genus: Diplura
- Species: D. lineata

Binomial name
- Diplura lineata (Lucas, 1857)

Synonyms
- Diplura fasciata (Bertkau, 1880); Thalerothele fasciata Bertkau, 1880; Thalerothele fasciata Simon, 1903; Thalerothele fasciata Mello-Leitão, 1923

= Diplura lineata =

Funnel-web tarantula from South America

Diplura lineata is a species of funnel-web tarantulas belonging to the subfamily Diplurinae. This species can be found in Venezuela and Brazil.
