= Diplura (disambiguation) =

Diplura, "two-pronged bristletails", is an order of hexapods closely related to insects

Diplura may also refer to:

- Diplura (spider), a genus of mygalomorph spiders
- Diplura (alga), a genus of brown algae in the order Ishigeales

== See also ==
- Dipleura, a genus of trilobite
