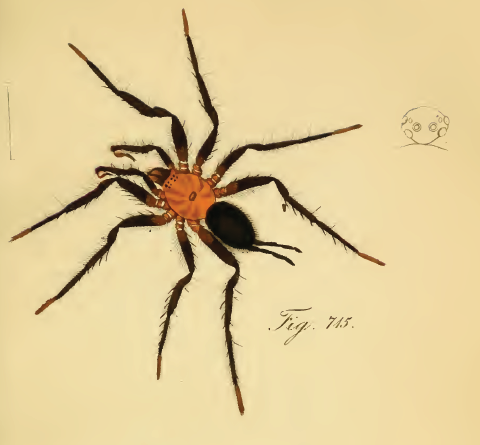
- Diplura macrura

Scientific classification
- Domain: Eukaryota
- Kingdom: Animalia
- Phylum: Arthropoda
- Subphylum: Chelicerata
- Class: Arachnida
- Order: Araneae
- Infraorder: Mygalomorphae
- Family: Dipluridae
- Genus: Diplura; C. L. Koch, 1850

Type species
- D. macrura (C. L. Koch, 1841)

Species
- 17, see text

Synonyms
- Achetopus Tullgren, 1905; Euharmonicon Mello-Leitão, 1920; Evagrella Mello-Leitão, 1923; Melodeus F. O. Pickard-Cambridge, 1896; Parathalerothele Canals, 1931; Prosharmonicon Mello-Leitão, 1938; Pseudohermachura Mello-Leitão, 1927; Taunayella Mello-Leitão, 1923; Thalerothele Bertkau, 1880

= Diplura (spider) =

Genus of spiders

Diplura is a genus of South American curtain web spiders that was first described by C. L. Koch in 1850. It is found in South America and Cuba belonging to the subfamily Diplurinae.

== Description ==
Species of Diplura possess a lyra on their prolateral maxillae. Diplura species can be distinguished from Trechona sp. by the number of setae on this lyra. They differ from Harmonicon sp. by the leg formula (1423 in Harmonicon, rather than 4123 in other genera of the subfamily) and the shape of the lyra bristles.

== Species ==
As of November 2024 it contains 17 species:

- Diplura argentina (Canals, 1931) – Argentina
- Diplura catharinensis (Mello-Leitão, 1927) – Brazil
- Diplura erlandi (Tullgren, 1905) – Bolivia
- Diplura garbei (Mello-Leitão, 1923) – Brazil
- Diplura garleppi (Simon, 1892) – Bolivia
- Diplura lineata (Lucas, 1857) – Brazil
- Diplura macrura (C. L. Koch, 1841) (type) – Brazil
- Diplura mapinguari Pedroso, Giupponi & Baptista, 2018 – Brazil
- Diplura nigra (F. O. Pickard-Cambridge, 1896) – Brazil
- Diplura paraguayensis (Gerschman & Schiapelli, 1940) – Paraguay, Argentina
- Diplura parallela (Mello-Leitão, 1923) – Brazil
- Diplura petrunkevitchi (Caporiacco, 1955) – Venezuela
- Diplura riveti (Simon, 1903) – Ecuador
- Diplura rodrigoi Pedroso, Giupponi & Baptista, 2018 – Brazil
- Diplura sanguinea (F. O. Pickard-Cambridge, 1896) – Brazil
- Diplura studiosa (Mello-Leitão, 1920) – Brazil
- Diplura taunayi (Mello-Leitão, 1923) – Brazil
