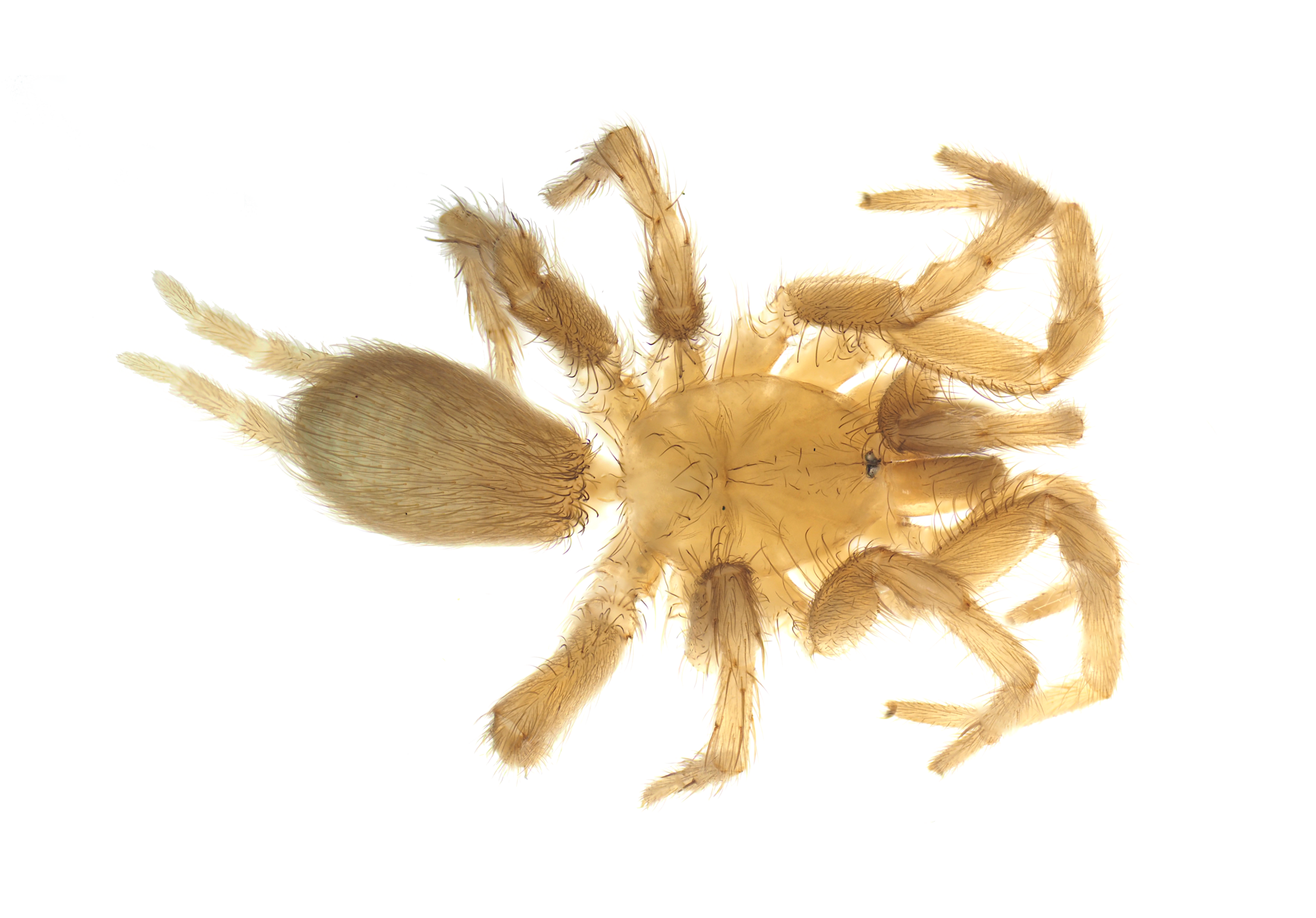
- Masteria toddae from Cape Tribulation, Queensland, Australia

Scientific classification
- Kingdom: Animalia
- Phylum: Arthropoda
- Subphylum: Chelicerata
- Class: Arachnida
- Order: Araneae
- Infraorder: Mygalomorphae
- Family: Dipluridae
- Genus: Masteria
- Species: M. toddae

Binomial name
- Masteria toddae Raven, 1979

= Masteria toddae =

Species of spider

Masteria toddae is a species of curtain-web spider in the Dipluridae family. It is endemic to Australia. It was described in 1979 by Australian arachnologist Robert Raven.

== Distribution and habitat ==
The species occurs in tropical Far North Queensland, in closed montane forest habitats. The type locality is Home Rule, Rossville, in the Shire of Cook.

== Behaviour ==
The spiders are fossorial, terrestrial predators.
