= Trechona venosa =

Scientific classification
- Kingdom: Animalia
- Phylum: Arthropoda
- Subphylum: Chelicerata
- Class: Arachnida
- Order: Araneae
- Infraorder: Mygalomorphae
- Family: Dipluridae
- Genus: Trechona
- Species: T. venosa

Binomial name
- Trechona venosa Latreille, 1832

Species of spider

Trechona venosa is a species of a venomous spider endemic to South America.

== Description and behavior ==
Trechona venosa is a large South American mygalomorphae, they grow from 3 to 4.5 in length (1.2–1.8 inches). In wingspan, they can grow from 6 to 7 cm, equivalent to 2.4–2.8 inches respectively, while the fangs measure 3–4 mm in length. Its color is black or brownish-gray, with yellow stripes on the abdomen. Trechona venosa is not an aggressive spider, inhabiting plants in the tropical forests of the Atlantic Forest.

They live on the edges of forests in places far from housing and human activity. They have nocturnal /twilight habits, they are solitary animals, meeting members of their species only during the mating season. They weave funnel-shaped webs.

== Distribution ==
These spiders are restricted to the Atlantic Forest of Brazil.

== Venom ==
The venom of Trechona venosa has a lethal dose of 0.070 mg for 20 grams rat by subcutaneous injection, and 0.030 mg by intravenous injection, 2 mg by intramuscular injection results in muscle contractions, paralysis and death in rats, while 0.4 mg results in death by tetanism, for pigeons, the lethal dose ranges from 0.01–0.007 mg, by intravenous injection. The average yield is 1.00 mg, and the maximum is 1.70 mg. Symptoms in mice include severe pain, tremors, salivation, urine output, paroxysmal tetany, spasmodic breathing movements and coma. Symptoms in humans are not known, as accidents are extremely rare, but symptomatic envenoming is possible.
