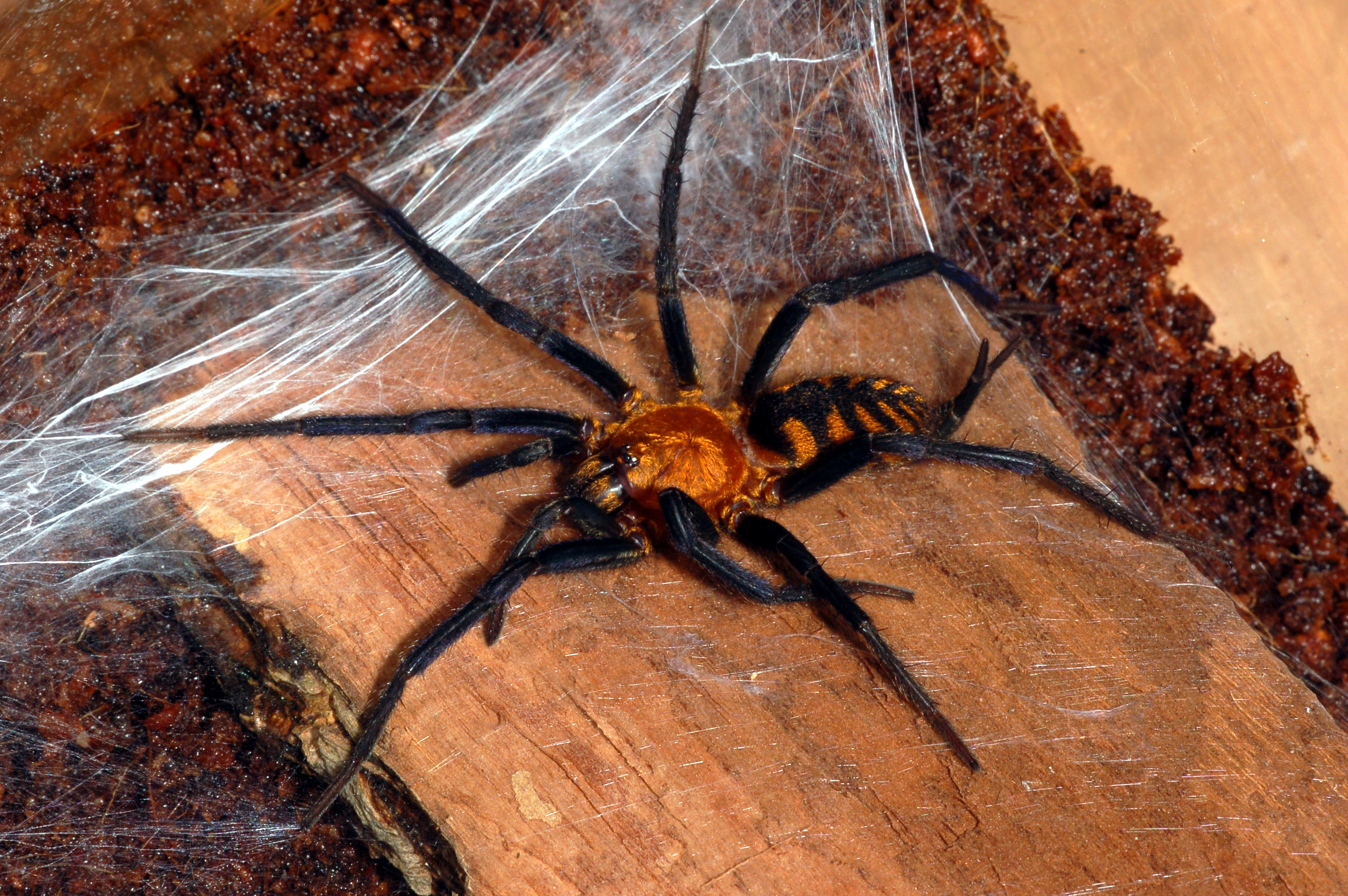
- Linothele fallax

Scientific classification
- Kingdom: Animalia
- Phylum: Arthropoda
- Subphylum: Chelicerata
- Class: Arachnida
- Order: Araneae
- Infraorder: Mygalomorphae
- Clade: Avicularioidea
- Family: Dipluridae; Simon, 1889

Diversity
- 8 genera, 154 species
- blue: reported countries (WSC) green: observation hotspots (iNaturalist)

= Dipluridae =

Dipluridae Temporal range: Norian - Present

Family of spiders

The family Dipluridae, known as curtain-web spiders (or confusingly as funnel-web tarantulas, a name shared with other distantly related families) are a group of spiders in the infraorder Mygalomorphae, that have two pairs of booklungs, and chelicerae (fangs) that move up and down in a stabbing motion. A number of genera, including that of the Sydney funnel-web spider (Atrax), used to be classified in this family but have now been moved to Atracidae.

== Description ==
Masteria petrunkevitchi eye pattern

Dipluridae lack rastella (stout conical spines on their chelicerae). Their carapace is characterized by the head region not being higher than the thoracic region. Their posterior median spinnerets (silk-extruding organs) are much shorter than their posterior lateral spinnerets, which have three segments, and are elongated (almost as long as their opisthosoma).

Most of the species are medium to small-sized spiders; some may measure about 15 mm.

The cave species Masteria caeca is eyeless.

== Biology ==
Members of this family often build rather messy funnel-webs. Some build silk-lined burrows instead of webs (Diplura, Trechona, Harpathele, some Linothele sp.). They generally build their retreats in crevices in earthen banks, the bark of trees, under logs or in leaf litter.

== Distribution ==
As circumscribed as of October 2025, the family is mostly found in South America and the Caribbean, with some Masteria species found in Australia and Oceania.

== Taxonomy ==
The family Dipluridae was first erected in 1889 by Eugène Simon. A major study of the Mygalomorphae by Robert Raven in 1985 characterized the Dipluridae on morphological grounds, in particular the possession of long and widely spaced spinnerets. Raven divided the family into four subfamilies: Diplurinae, Euagrinae, Ischnothelinae and Masteriinae. Molecular phylogenetic studies from 1993 onwards showed that with Raven's circumscription, Dipluridae was not monophyletic, with the subfamilies Ischnothelinae and Euagrinae only very distantly related to Diplurinae. Accordingly, in 2020, Opatova et al. restricted Dipluridae to Diplurinae and Masteriinae, and elevated the subfamilies Ischnothelinae and Euagrinae to the families Ischnothelidae and Euagridae. The genus Microhexura was removed from its former placement in Euagrinae and placed in a separate family, Microhexuridae.

The family Dipluridae is most closely related to the Cyrtaucheniidae, and is placed in the "Nemesioidina" clade of 'advanced' mygalomorph families:

- "Nemesioidina"
  - Nemesiidae
  - - Pycnothelidae
    - - - Dipluridae
        - Cyrtaucheniidae
      - - Anamidae
        - - Entypesidae
          - Microstigmatidae

== Genera ==
As of January 2026, this family includes eight genera and 154 species:

- Diplura C. L. Koch, 1850 – South America
- Harmonicon F. O. Pickard-Cambridge, 1896 – Brazil, French Guiana
- Harpathele Wermelinger-Moreira, Pedroso, Castanheira & Baptista, 2024 – Brazil
- Linothele Karsch, 1879 – Bahamas, Panama, South America
- Masteria L. Koch, 1873 – Philippines, North America, Australia, Fiji, New Caledonia, Papua New Guinea, South America
- Siremata Passanha & Brescovit, 2018 – Brazil
- Striamea Raven, 1981 – Colombia
- Trechona C. L. Koch, 1850 – Brazil

=== Transferred to other families ===
The following genera are now placed in other families (elevated from subfamilies):

- Allothele Tucker, 1920 → Euagridae
- Andethele Coyle, 1995 → Ischnothelidae
- Australothele Raven, 1984 → Euagridae
- Caledothele Raven, 1991 → Euagridae
- Carrai Raven, 1984 → Euagridae
- Cethegus Thorell, 1881 → Euagridae
- Chilehexops Coyle, 1986 → Euagridae
- Euagrus Ausserer, 1875 → Euagridae
- Indothele Coyle, 1995 → Ischnothelidae
- Ischnothele Ausserer, 1875 → Ischnothelidae
- Lathrothele Benoit, 1965 → Ischnothelidae
- Leptothele Raven & Schwendinger, 1995 → Euagridae
- Microhexura Crosby & Bishop, 1925 → Microhexuridae
- Namirea Raven, 1984 → Euagridae
- Phyxioschema Simon, 1889 → Euagridae
- Stenygrocercus Simon, 1892 → Euagridae
- Thelechoris Karsch, 1881 → Ischnothelidae
- Troglodiplura Main, 1969 → Anamidae
- Vilchura Ríos-Tamayo & Goloboff, 2017 → Euagridae

=== Extinct species ===
Extinct genera and species that have been placed in this family include:

- †Clostes Menge, 1869 — Eocene Baltic amber
  - †Clostes priscus (Menge, 1869)
- †Cretadiplura Selden, 2005 — Early Cretaceous (Aptian) Crato Formation, Brazil
  - †Cretadiplura ceara Selden, 2005
- †Dinodiplura Selden, 2005 — Early Cretaceous (Aptian) Crato Formation, Brazil
  - †Dinodiplura ambulacra Selden, 2005
- †Seldischnoplura Raven, Jell & Knezour, 2015 — Early Cretaceous (Aptian) Crato Formation, Brazil
  - †Seldischnoplura seldeni Raven, Jell & Knezour, 2015
- †Edwa Raven, Jell & Knezour, 2015 — Late Triassic (Norian) Blackstone Formation, Australia
  - †Edwa maryae Raven, Jell & Knezour, 2015
- † Phyxioschemoides Wunderlich, 2015 — Cretaceous Burmese amber
  - † Phyxioschemoides collembola Wunderlich, 2015
- † Cethegoides Wunderlich, 2017 — Cretaceous Burmese amber
  - † Cethegoides patricki Wunderlich, 2017

== See also ==
- Spider families
