= Accola =

Accola is a surname. Notable people with the surname include:

- Candice King (née Accola) (born 1987), American actress and singer
- Martina Accola (born 1969), Swiss alpine skier
- Paul Accola (born 1967), Swiss alpine skier

== See also ==
- Masteria, genus of spiders formerly known as Accola
