= Siremata =

Scientific classification
- Domain: Eukaryota
- Kingdom: Animalia
- Phylum: Arthropoda
- Subphylum: Chelicerata
- Class: Arachnida
- Order: Araneae
- Infraorder: Mygalomorphae
- Family: Dipluridae
- Genus: Siremata; Passanha & Brescovit, 2018

Type species
- S. valteri Passanha & Brescovit, 2018

Species
- S. juruti Passanha & Brescovit, 2018 — Brazil; S. lucasae Passanha & Brescovit, 2018 — Brazil; S. valteri Passanha & Brescovit, 2018 — Brazil

Genus of spiders

Siremata is a genus of curtain web spiders first described by V. Passanha & Antônio Domingos Brescovit in 2018. As of April 2019 it contains only three species.
