= Tepuithele =

Scientific classification
- Kingdom: Animalia
- Phylum: Arthropoda
- Subphylum: Chelicerata
- Class: Arachnida
- Order: Araneae
- Infraorder: Mygalomorphae
- Family: Ischnothelidae
- Genus: Tepuithele; Dupérré & Tapia, 2025
- Species: T. nangaritza

Binomial name
- Tepuithele nangaritza Dupérré & Tapia, 2025

Species of spider

Tepuithele is a monotypic genus of spiders in the family Ischnothelidae containing the single species, Tepuithele nangaritza.

== Distribution ==
Tepuithele nangaritza has only been recorded from the Cordillera del Cóndor mountain range of Zamora-Chinchipe Province in southern Ecuador.

== Etymology ==
The genus name is a combination of Tepui, the geological mountain formation where it was found, and -thele.

The species is named after the river Nangaritza, which flows near the type locality.
