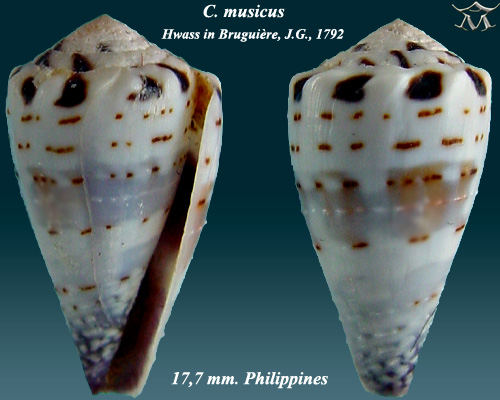
- Apertural and abapertural views of shell of Conus musicus Hwass in Bruguière, J.G., 1792
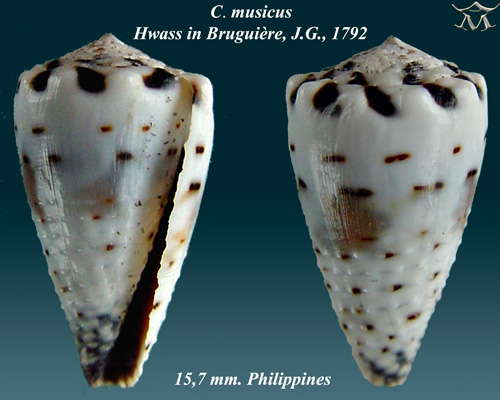

Conservation status
- Least Concern (IUCN 3.1)

Scientific classification
- Kingdom: Animalia
- Phylum: Mollusca
- Class: Gastropoda
- Subclass: Caenogastropoda
- Order: Neogastropoda
- Superfamily: Conoidea
- Family: Conidae
- Genus: Conus
- Species: C. musicus

Binomial name
- Conus musicus Hwass in Bruguière, 1792

Synonyms
- Conus (Harmoniconus) musicus Hwass in Bruguière, 1792 · accepted, alternate representation; Conus acutus G. B. Sowerby II, 1857 (junior homonym of Conus acutus Anton, 1839); Conus ceylanensis Hwass in Bruguière, 1792; Conus mighelsi Kiener, 1845; Harmoniconus musicus (Hwass in Bruguière, 1792); Virroconus musicus (Hwass in Bruguière, 1792)

= Conus musicus =

Species of sea snail

Conus musicus, common name the music cone, is a species of sea snail, a marine gastropod mollusk in the family Conidae, the cone snails and their allies.

These snails are predatory and venomous. They are capable of stinging humans, therefore live ones should be handled carefully or not at all.

There is one subspecies Conus musicus parvatus Walls, 1979, synonym of Conus parvatus Walls, 1979

== Description ==
The size of an adult shell varies between 14 mm and 30 mm. The color of the shell is whitish, with light ash-violet broad bands and narrow revolving lines of chocolate, broken up into short lines and spots. The spire is often slightly coronate, rayed with chocolate.

== Distribution ==
this species occurs in the Red Sea and in the Indian Ocean off Aldabra, Chagos, Madagascar, Mozambique and Tanzania; in the Central Indian Ocean (off Sri Lanka and the Maldives) to the Marshall Islands, the Solomon Islands and Fiji, Ryukyu Islands; off Australia (New South Wales, Northern Territory, Queensland, Western Australia).
