= Sphaerobothria =

Scientific classification
- Kingdom: Animalia
- Phylum: Arthropoda
- Subphylum: Chelicerata
- Class: Arachnida
- Order: Araneae
- Infraorder: Mygalomorphae
- Family: Theraphosidae
- Genus: Sphaerobothria; Karsch, 1879
- Species: S. hoffmanni

Binomial name
- Sphaerobothria hoffmanni Karsch, 1879

Genus of spiders

Sphaerobothria is a monotypic genus of Central American tarantulas containing the single species, Sphaerobothria hoffmanni. It was first described by Ferdinand Anton Franz Karsch in 1879, and is found in Panama and Costa Rica.
