= Anton Karsch =

German physician, botanist, microbiologist, cell biologist and natural philosopher

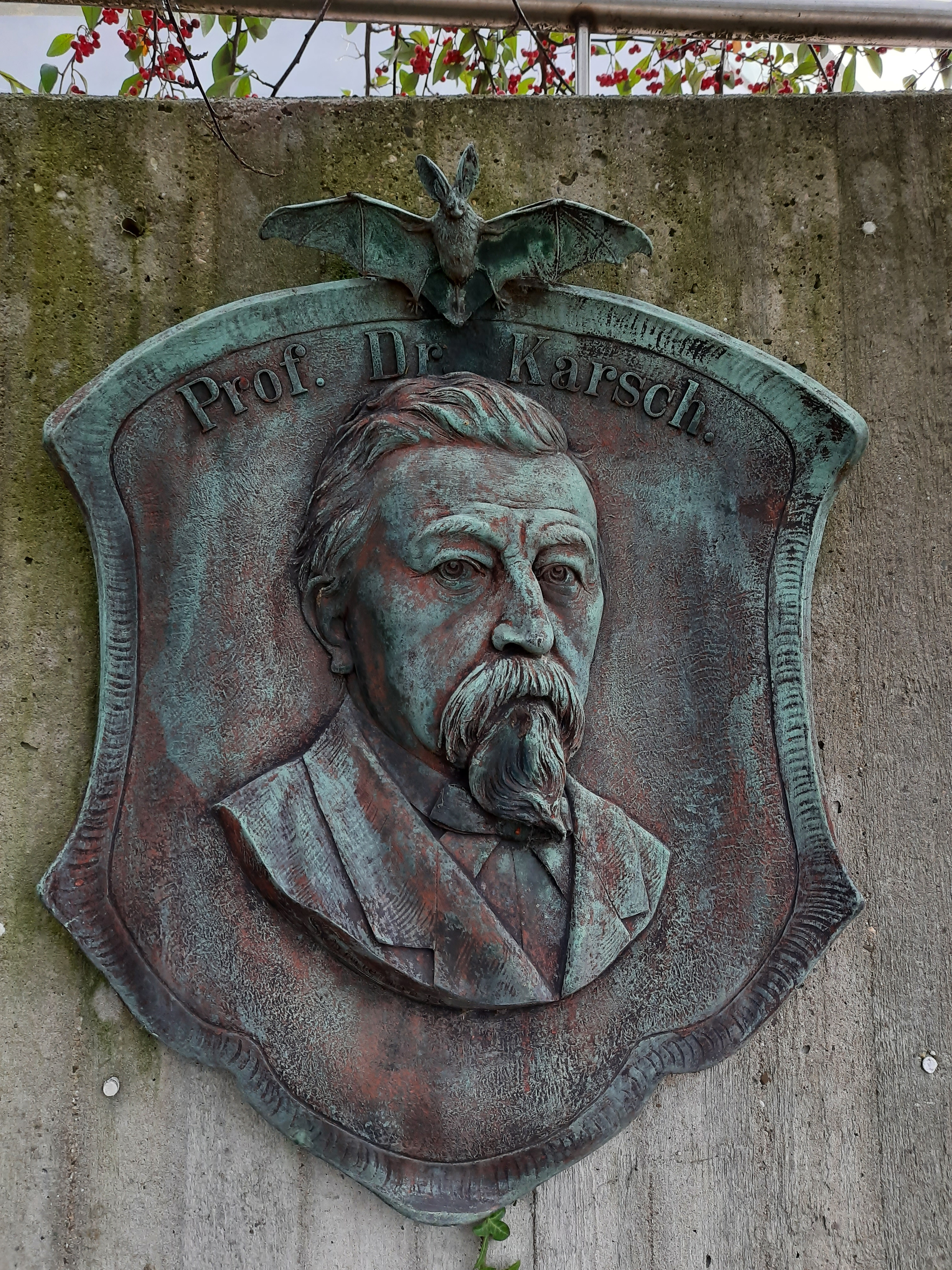
Memorial at Münster zoo. The medallion was made by sculptor August Schmiemann and unveiled in 1903 by zoo director Hermann Landois.

Anton Ferdinand Franz Karsch (19 June 1822 – 15 March 1892) was a German physician, botanist, microbiologist, cell biologist and natural philosopher. He served as a privy medical councilor in Westphalia. He was a prominent figure in the academic circles of Münster where he was a curator of the natural history museum and a founding member of the board that helped establish a zoological section.

== Life and work ==
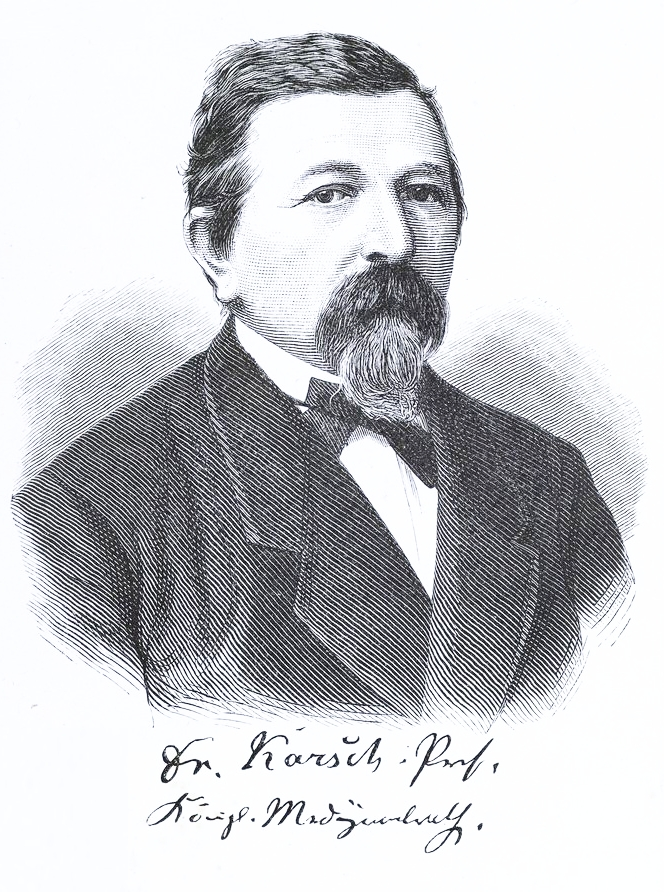
1878 engraving

Karsch was born in Münster, the son of district court secretary Ferdinand, and received his early education at the Paulinium Gymnasium. He went to the University of Greifswald in 1842 and received a doctorate in philosophy with a dissertation titled “De quorundam Limnaeorum evolutione" in 1846 and a medical degree with a dissertation titled "De capilliti humani coloribus quaedam". He completed his habilitation at Bonn in 1847 and became a lecturer. In 1948 he became a general practitioner in Münster while also giving lectures. He became a full professor in 1858 and in 1874 he became a member of the medical council. He took an interest in natural history and translated some of Aristotle's works and published on the botany of Westphalia. He was a curator of the natural history museum and was in charge of the herbarium (1848-1871) and the botanical garden (1854-1867). Karsch wrote in the interdisciplinary journal “Natur und Offenbarung” which he helped found and edit from its inception in 1855, writing both on nature and philosophy. He began to study living forms under the microscope, writing about the life of a gnat in 1855, describing microscopic structures of insects and plants. He examined the stomata of leaves and suggested that they might be the point of entry for plant pathogens. He also suggested that plant cells might be able to communicate with each other to respond to microbial infections using the intercellular spaces in an 1855 note on potato diseases. In 1862 he wrote a book appreciating homeopathy. He also wrote a theological text titled as the natural history of the devil ("Naturgeschichte des Teufels") in 1877.

Karsch married Maria Haack and they had a son Ferdinand Franz Anton Karsch (1853-1936) who was also a zoologist and paleontologist who served as a curator at the Natural History Museum in Berlin and worked on gall midges and spiders. He also wrote on sexual behaviour in humans and animals under the name Ferdinand Karsch-Haack.
