= Harpathele =

Scientific classification
- Kingdom: Animalia
- Phylum: Arthropoda
- Subphylum: Chelicerata
- Class: Arachnida
- Order: Araneae
- Infraorder: Mygalomorphae
- Family: Dipluridae
- Genus: Harpathele; Wermelinger-Moreira, Pedroso, Castanheira & Baptista, 2024

Type species
- H. gymnognatha (Bertkau, 1880)

Species
- 3, see text

Genus of spiders

Harpathele is a genus of curtain-web spiders that was first described by Gabriel Wermelinger-Moreira, Denis Rafael Pedroso, Pedro de Souza Castanheira, and Renner Luiz Cerqueira Baptista in 2024. It is known only from the Southeast region of Brazil.

== Description ==
They are relatively small spiders for their family, with males measuring 14.6-21.4 mm long, and females measuring 16.0-21.7 mm long. They have a brown carapace, dark brown to orange brown legs, and an oval abdomen longer than it is wide that varies from dark brown to dirty yellow.

== Behaviour ==
Harpathele are presumably nocturnal, fossorial spiders like other members of Dipluridae. Specimens were collected from under rotten logs on the forest floor, without any webs.

== Species ==
As of November 2024, it contains 3 species:

- Harpathele cariacica Wermelinger-Moreira, Pedroso, Castanheira & Baptista, 2024 – Brazil
- Harpathele gymnognatha (Bertkau, 1880) (type) – Brazil
- Harpathele salinas palpator Wermelinger-Moreira, Pedroso, Castanheira & Baptista, 2024 – Brazil
