= Striamea =

Scientific classification
- Domain: Eukaryota
- Kingdom: Animalia
- Phylum: Arthropoda
- Subphylum: Chelicerata
- Class: Arachnida
- Order: Araneae
- Infraorder: Mygalomorphae
- Family: Dipluridae
- Genus: Striamea; Raven, 1981

Type species
- S. gertschi Raven, 1981

Species
- S. gertschi Raven, 1981 – Colombia; S. magna Raven, 1981 – Colombia

Genus of spiders

Striamea is a genus of South American curtain web spiders that was first described by Robert Raven in 1981. As of November 2024 it contains only two species, both found in Colombia: S. gertschi and S. magna.
