= Indothele lanka =

Scientific classification
- Kingdom: Animalia
- Phylum: Arthropoda
- Subphylum: Chelicerata
- Class: Arachnida
- Order: Araneae
- Infraorder: Mygalomorphae
- Family: Ischnothelidae
- Genus: Indothele
- Species: I. lanka

Binomial name
- Indothele lanka Coyle, 1995

Species of spider

Indothele lanka, is a species of spider of the genus Indothele. It is endemic to Sri Lanka.
