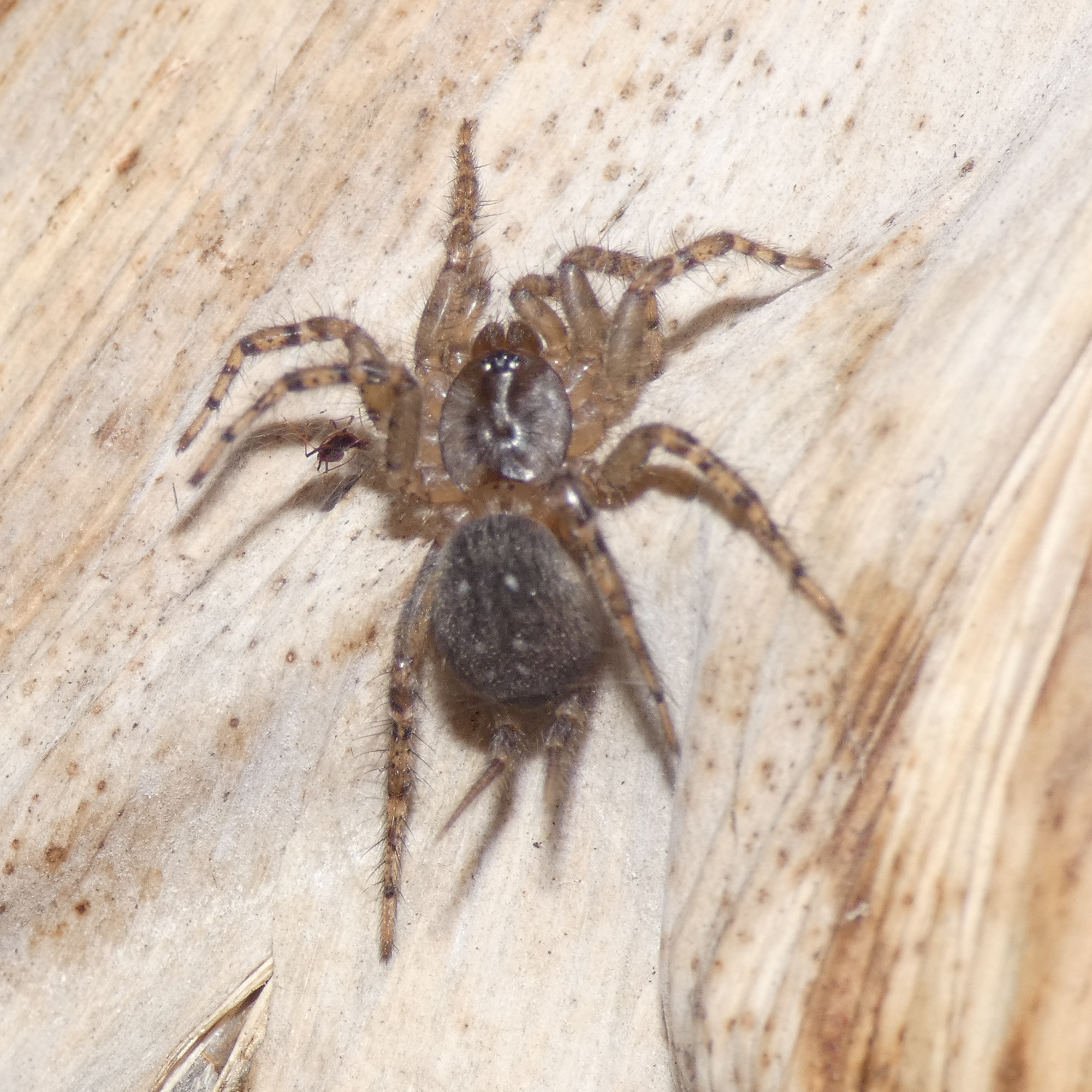
- T. striatipes
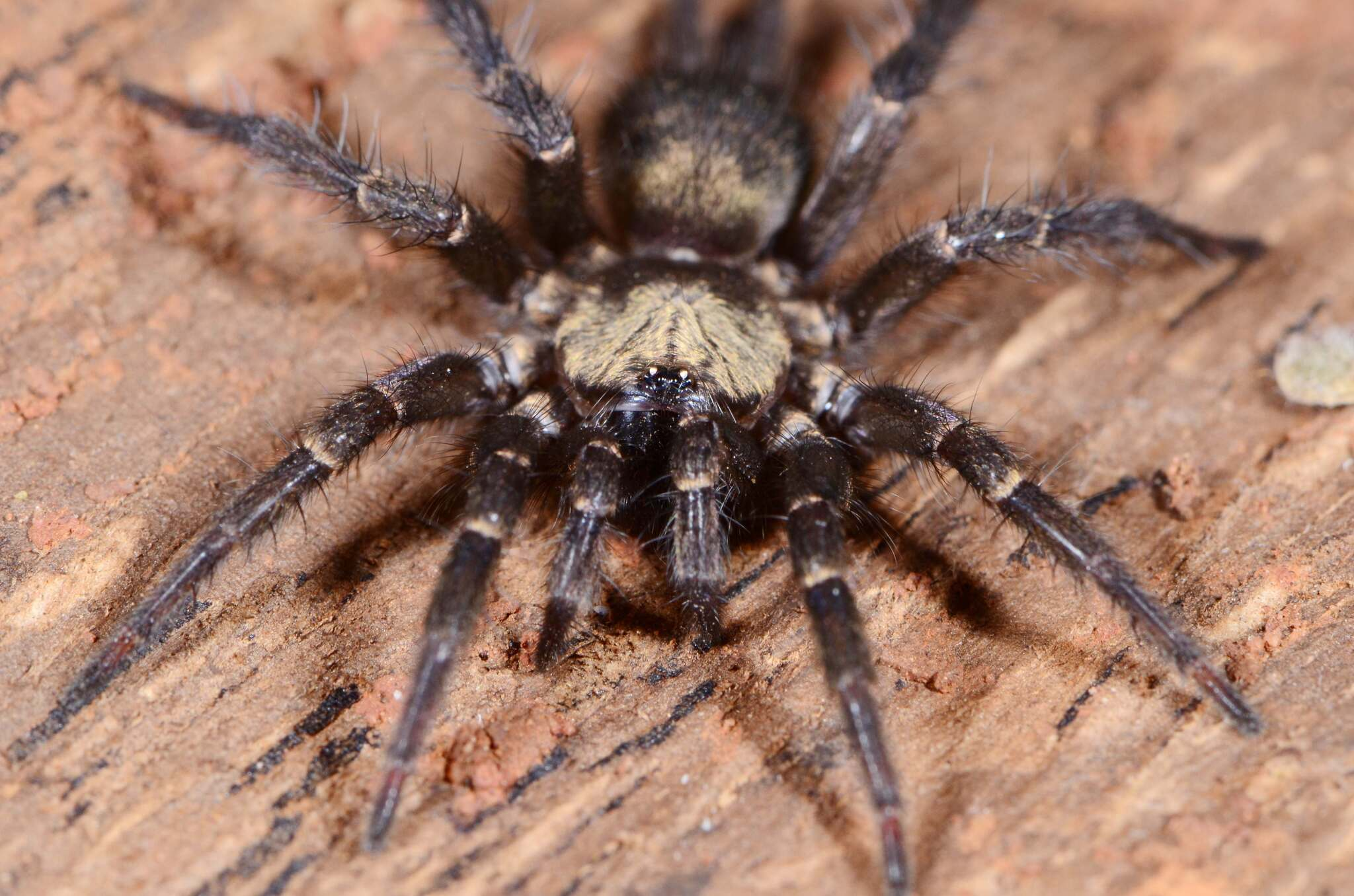
- female T. striatipes

Scientific classification
- Kingdom: Animalia
- Phylum: Arthropoda
- Subphylum: Chelicerata
- Class: Arachnida
- Order: Araneae
- Infraorder: Mygalomorphae
- Family: Ischnothelidae
- Genus: Thelechoris
- Species: T. striatipes

Binomial name
- Thelechoris striatipes Simon, 1889

= Thelechoris striatipes =

Species of spider

Thelechoris striatipes is a species of spider in the family Ischnothelidae. It is endemic to Sub-Saharan Africa.

== Distribution ==
T. striatipes is found in Madagascar, Namibia, Zambia, Malawi, Botswana, Mozambique, and South Africa.

== Habitat and ecology ==
T. striatipes is widely distributed in Africa. This wide geographic range is presumably the result, in part, of this species' ability to inhabit a wide variety of natural and disturbed habitats. They make large ill-defined sheet-web with a funnel retreat to detect and capture prey in trees or from under stones, soil crevices, logs or moss mats or above ground in protected spots at the base of plants. Sampled from Savanna, Forest and Grassland biomes.

== Description ==
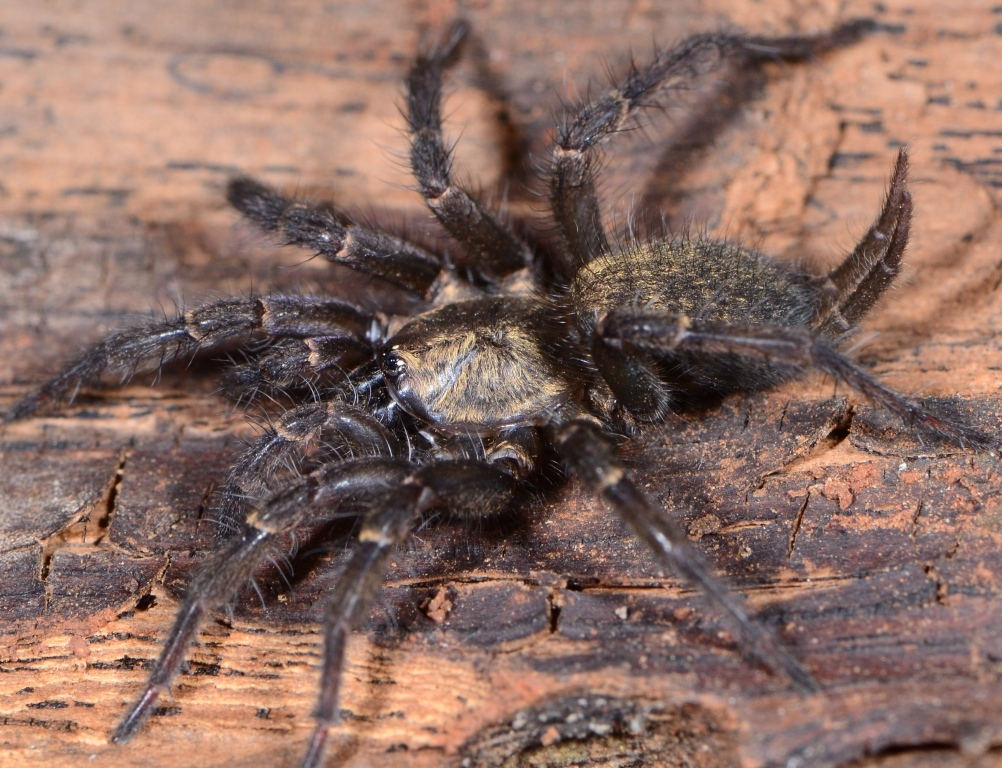
female T. striatipes

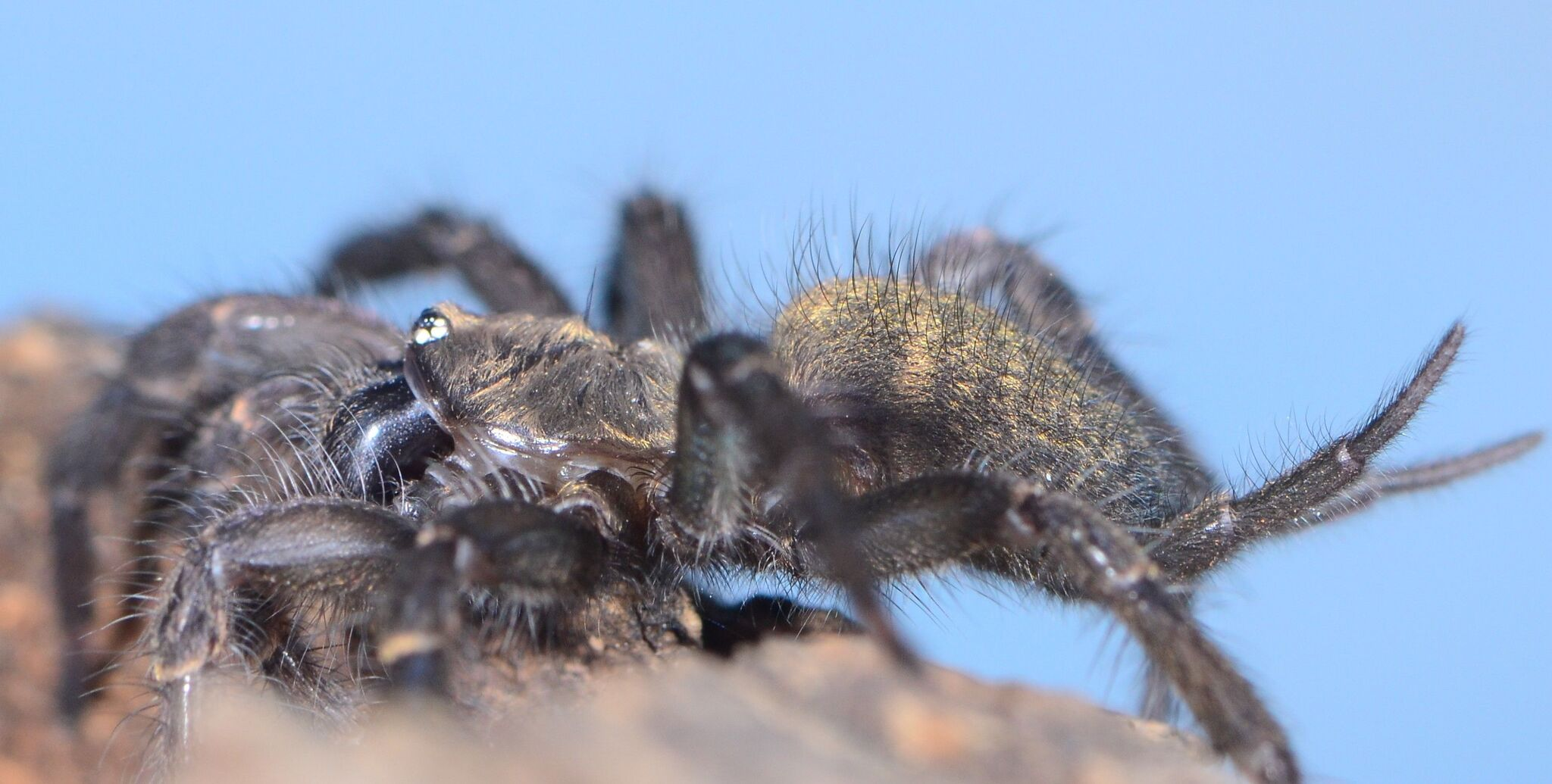
female T. striatipes

== Conservation ==
There are no significant threats to the species. Protected in Lekgalameetsi Nature Reserve, Hluhluwe Nature Reserve, Lapalala Wilderness Game Reserve and Blouberg Nature Reserve. No conservation actions are recommended.
