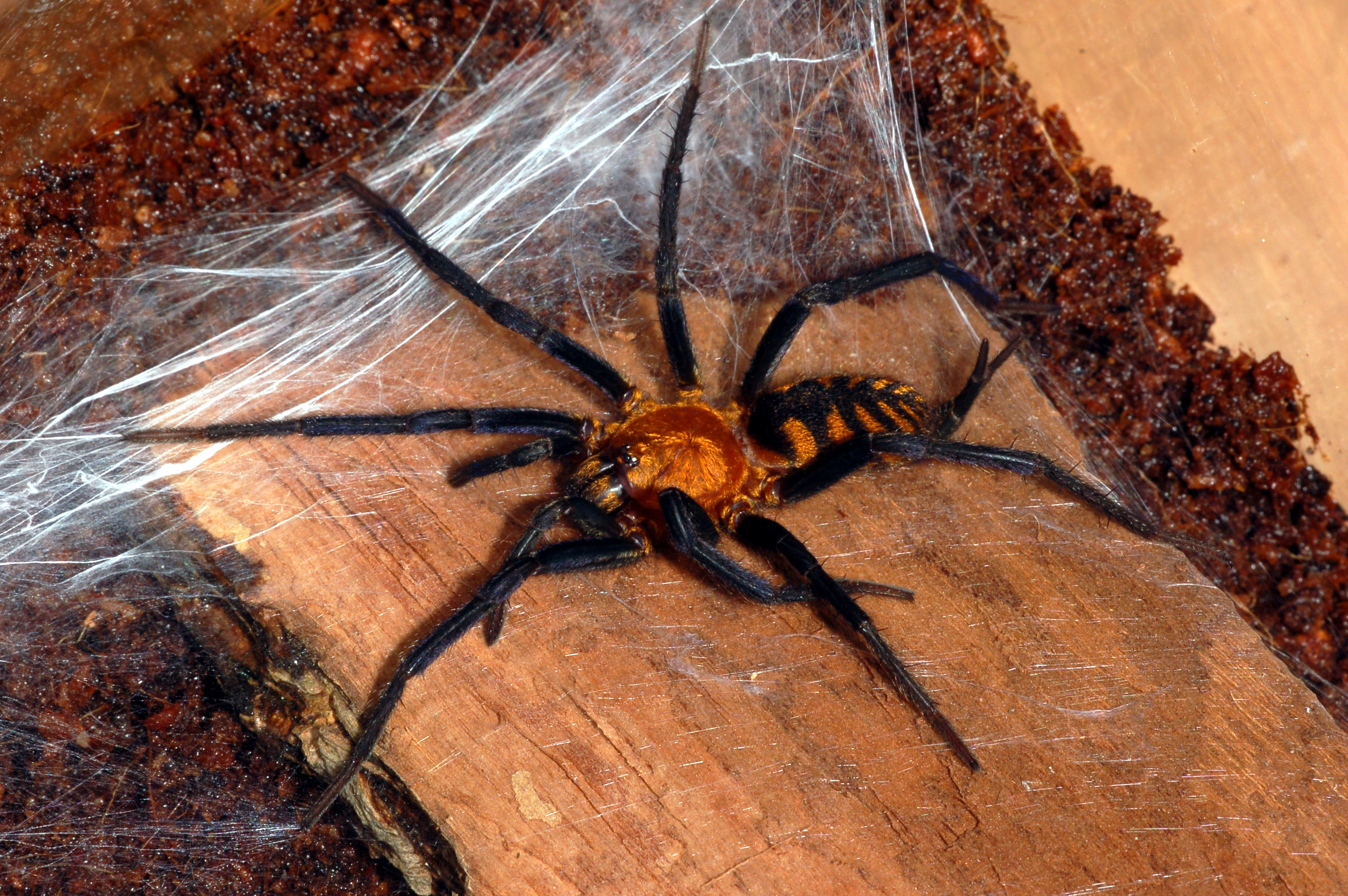
- L. fallax

Scientific classification
- Domain: Eukaryota
- Kingdom: Animalia
- Phylum: Arthropoda
- Subphylum: Chelicerata
- Class: Arachnida
- Order: Araneae
- Infraorder: Mygalomorphae
- Family: Dipluridae
- Genus: Linothele; Karsch, 1879

Type species
- L. curvitarsis Karsch, 1879

Species
- 67, see text

Synonyms
- Uruchus Simon, 1889

= Linothele =

Genus of spiders

Linothele is a genus of curtain web spiders that was first described by Ferdinand Karsch in 1879. All but one of the described species are from South America (Bolivia, Brazil, Colombia, Ecuador, Peru and Venezuela) and adjacent Panama. The exception is L. septentrionalis from the far-away Bahamas, although it has certain features that suggest it may belong in another genus.

Linothele females are stouter and tend to be more conspicuously colored than males. They make relatively complex webs that in most species are on or near the ground, mudbanks or rock walls (a few are arboreal), with females spending most of their life in a tunnel-like retreat. The male may wander and often inhabits a smaller web near a female's. The webs of Linothele species are commonly co-inhabited by tiny kleptoparasitic spiders of the genus Mysmenopsis.

== Venom ==
In humans, bites from Linothele typically cause mild pain and a numbness/tingling feeling that can last for a few days. They are generally reluctant to bite and will attempt to flee, but some species, especially those from dry regions, tend to be more defensive.

The venom of Linothele sp has a LD-50 dose of 0.6 mg/kg in laboratory mice. Two toxins, both of low molecular weight, were isolated in the venom, Ls1 and Ls2. These two toxins have been shown to be quite lethal to laboratory mice by injection into the cerebroventricular region. The lethal dose of Ls1 and Ls2 is 24 and 19 μg/kg respectively, both toxins represent 0.21% and 0.43% of the weight of the whole venom.

== Species ==
As of February 2025 it contains 67 species:

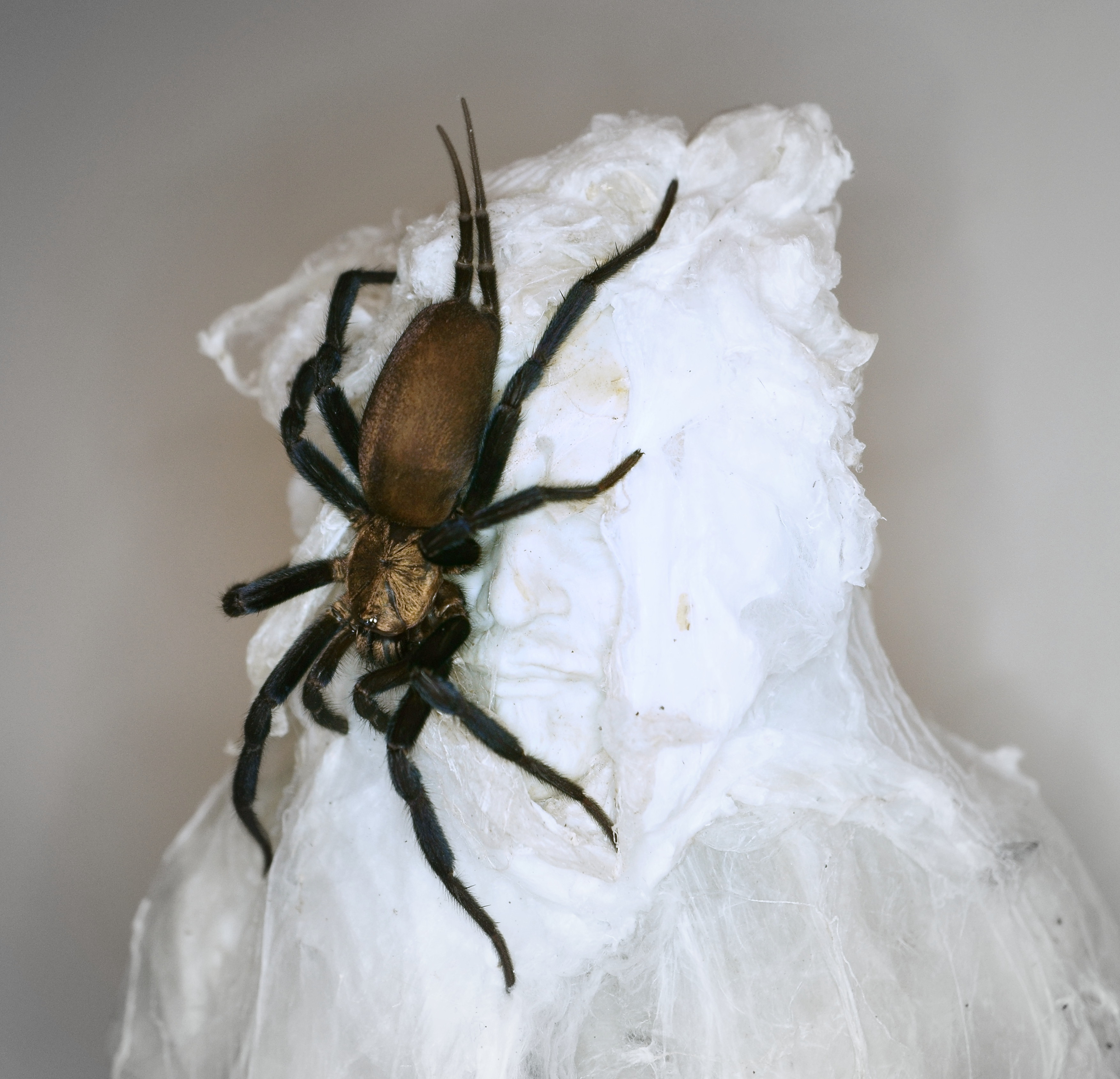
Linothele megatheloides

- Linothele abispa Sherwood, Drolshagen, Osorio, Benavides & Seiter, 2023 – Peru
- Linothele agelenoides Bäckstam, Drolshagen & Seiter, 2023 – Colombia
- Linothele alausi Dupérré & Tapia, 2023 – Ecuador
- Linothele amazonica Dupérré & Tapia, 2023 – Ecuador
- Linothele anabellecitae Dupérré & Tapia, 2023 – Ecuador
- Linothele angamarca Dupérré & Tapia, 2023 – Ecuador
- Linothele archidona Dupérré & Tapia, 2023 – Ecuador
- Linothele banos Dupérré & Tapia, 2023 – Ecuador
- Linothele canirasi Dupérré & Tapia, 2023 – Ecuador
- Linothele carchi Dupérré & Tapia, 2023 – Ecuador
- Linothele cavicola Goloboff, 1994 – Ecuador
- Linothele cayambe Dupérré & Tapia, 2023 – Ecuador
- Linothele condor Dupérré & Tapia, 2023 – Ecuador
- Linothele cornigera Penaherrera-R., Guerrero-Campoverde, Leon-E., Pinos-Sanchez & Cisneros-Heredia, 2023 – Ecuador
- Linothele costenita Dupérré & Tapia, 2023 – Ecuador
- Linothele cristata (Mello-Leitão, 1945) – Brazil
- Linothele cuencana Dupérré & Tapia, 2023 – Ecuador
- Linothele curvitarsis Karsch, 1879 (type) – Venezuela
- Linothele darien Wermelinger-Moreira, Castanheira & Baptista, 2024 – Panama
- Linothele fallax (Mello-Leitão, 1926) – Bolivia, Brazil
- Linothele gaboi Osorio, Benavides, Sherwood, Drolshagen & Seiter, 2023 – Colombia
- Linothele gaujoni (Simon, 1889) – Ecuador
- Linothele guacamayos Dupérré & Tapia, 2023 – Ecuador
- Linothele gualaquiza Dupérré & Tapia, 2023 – Ecuador
- Linothele guallupe Dupérré & Tapia, 2023 – Ecuador
- Linothele ilinizas Dupérré & Tapia, 2023 – Ecuador
- Linothele ireneae Dupérré & Tapia, 2023 – Ecuador
- Linothele jarrini Dupérré & Tapia, 2023 – Ecuador
- Linothele jatunsacha Dupérré & Tapia, 2023 – Ecuador
- Linothele javieri Dupérré & Tapia, 2023 – Ecuador
- Linothele jelskii (F. O. Pickard-Cambridge, 1896) – Peru
- Linothele kaysi Dupérré & Tapia, 2023 – Ecuador
- Linothele lacocha Dupérré & Tapia, 2023 – Ecuador
- Linothele lloa Dupérré & Tapia, 2023 – Ecuador
- Linothele longicauda (Ausserer, 1871) – Ecuador
- Linothele macrothelifera Strand, 1908 – Colombia
- Linothele megatheloides Paz & Raven, 1990 – Colombia
- Linothele milleri Dupérré & Tapia, 2023 – Ecuador
- Linothele molleturo Dupérré & Tapia, 2023 – Ecuador
- Linothele monticolens (Chamberlin, 1916) – Peru
- Linothele mubii Nicoletta, Ochoa, Chaparro & Ferretti, 2022 – Peru
- Linothele otokiki Dupérré & Tapia, 2023 – Ecuador
- Linothele otoyacu Dupérré & Tapia, 2023 – Ecuador
- Linothele paulistana (Mello-Leitão, 1924) – Brazil
- Linothele peguche Dupérré & Tapia, 2023 – Ecuador
- Linothele podocarpus Dupérré & Tapia, 2023 – Ecuador
- Linothele pomona Dupérré & Tapia, 2023 – Ecuador
- Linothele pristirana Dupérré & Tapia, 2023 – Ecuador
- Linothele pseudoquori Dupérré & Tapia, 2023 – Ecuador
- Linothele pukachumpi Dupérré & Tapia, 2015 – Ecuador
- Linothele quori Dupérré & Tapia, 2015 – Ecuador
- Linothele rionegro Dupérré & Tapia, 2023 – Ecuador
- Linothele septentrionalis Drolshagen & Bäckstam, 2021 – Bahamas
- Linothele sericata (Karsch, 1879) – Colombia
- Linothele sexfasciata (Schiapelli & Gerschman, 1945) – Venezuela
- Linothele sigchila Dupérré & Tapia, 2023 – Ecuador
- Linothele spinosa Drolshagen & Bäckstam, 2021 – Peru
- Linothele troncal Dupérré & Tapia, 2023 – Ecuador
- Linothele tsachilas Dupérré & Tapia, 2015 – Ecuador
- Linothele uniformis Drolshagen & Bäckstam, 2021 – Peru
- Linothele uvalino Dupérré & Tapia, 2023 – Ecuador
- Linothele victoria Dupérré & Tapia, 2023 – Ecuador
- Linothele wallacei Sherwood, Drolshagen, Osorio, Benavides & Seiter, 2023 – Peru
- Linothele wiwa Osorio, Benavides, Sherwood, Drolshagen & Seiter, 2023 – Colombia
- Linothele yanachanka Dupérré & Tapia, 2015 – Ecuador
- Linothele yunguilla Dupérré & Tapia, 2023 – Ecuador
- Linothele zaia Dupérré & Tapia, 2015 – Ecuador
