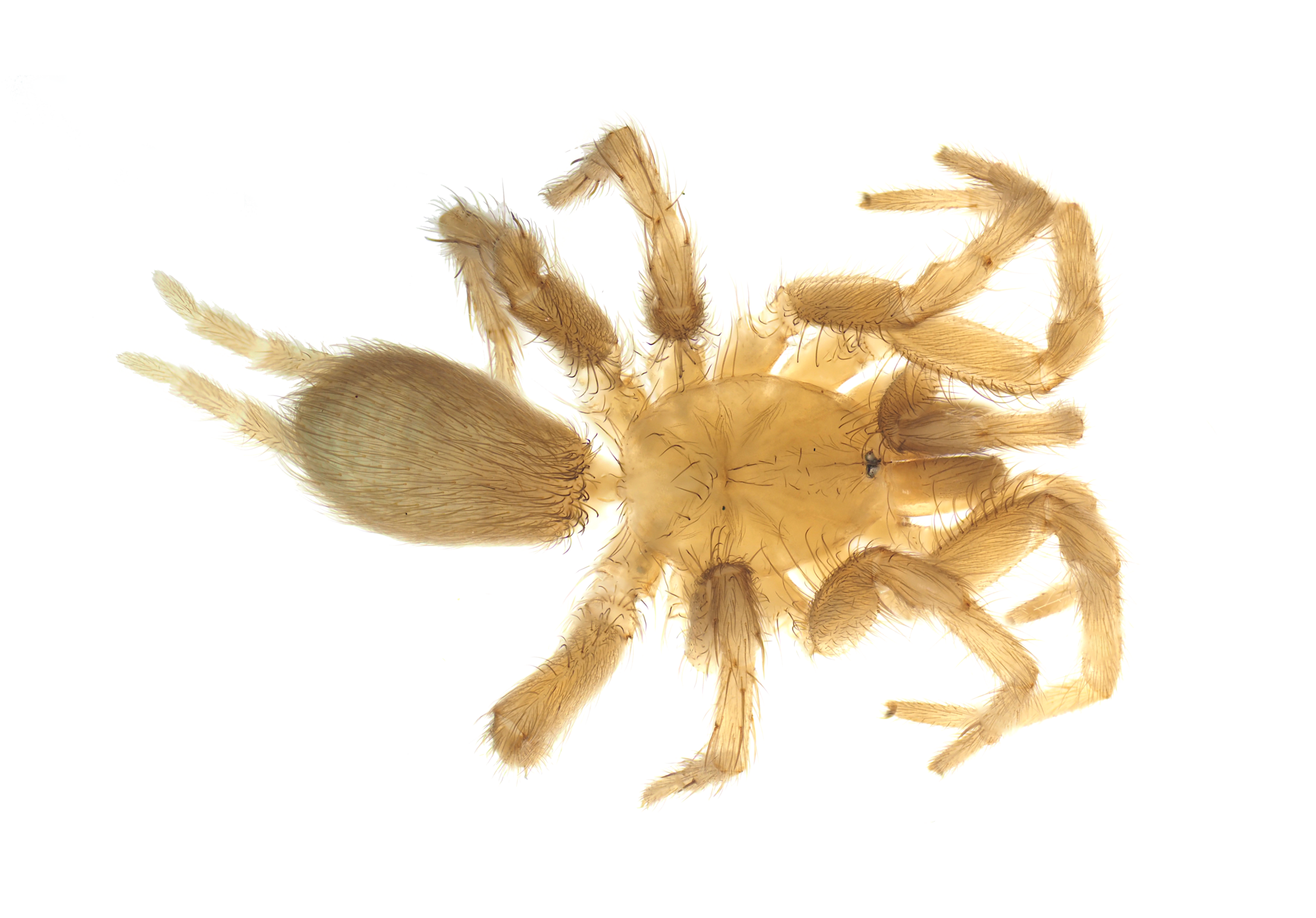
- Masteria toddae from Queensland, Australia

Scientific classification
- Kingdom: Animalia
- Phylum: Arthropoda
- Subphylum: Chelicerata
- Class: Arachnida
- Order: Araneae
- Infraorder: Mygalomorphae
- Family: Dipluridae
- Genus: Masteria; L. Koch, 1873

Type species
- M. hirsuta L. Koch, 1873

Species
- See text.

Synonyms
- Accola Simon, 1889; Antrochares Rainbow, 1898; Microsteria Wunderlich, 1988

= Masteria =

Masteria Temporal range: Neogene–present

Genus of spiders

Masteria is a genus of curtain web spiders that was first described by L. Koch in 1873. They occur in the tropics of Central to South America, Asia and Micronesia, with one species found in Australia. M. petrunkevitchi males are 4 millimetres (0.16 in) long and females are 5 millimetres (0.20 in) long. M. lewisi, M. barona, and M. downeyi are slightly smaller and have only six eyes. Most species in the genus have six eyes, but two (Masteria caecia and Masteria pecki) have no eyes.

== Species ==
As of October 2025, this genus includes 42 species:

- Masteria aguaruna Passanha & Brescovit, 2018 – Peru
- Masteria aimeae (Alayón, 1995) – Cuba
- Masteria amarumayu Passanha & Brescovit, 2018 – Brazil
- Masteria angienae Víquez, 2020 – Costa Rica (Cocos Island)
- Masteria barona (Chickering, 1967) – Trinidad
- Masteria boggildi Lissner, 2023 – Central America (presumably Costa Rica). Imported to Denmark
- Masteria caeca (Simon, 1892) – Philippines
- Masteria cavicola (Simon, 1892) – Philippines
- Masteria chalupas Dupérré & Tapia, 2021 – Ecuador
- Masteria colombiensis Raven, 1981 – Colombia
- Masteria downeyi (Chickering, 1967) – Costa Rica, Panama
- Masteria franzi Raven, 1991 – New Caledonia
- Masteria galipote Passanha & Brescovit, 2018 – Dominican Republic
- Masteria golovatchi Alayón, 1995 – Cuba
- Masteria guyanensis Almeida, Salvatierra & de Morais, 2018 – Guyana
- Masteria hirsuta L. Koch, 1873 – Fiji, Micronesia (type species)
- Masteria jatunsacha Dupérré & Tapia, 2021 – Ecuador
- Masteria kaltenbachi Raven, 1991 – New Caledonia
- Masteria lasdamas Dupérré & Tapia, 2021 – Ecuador
- Masteria lewisi (Chickering, 1965) – Jamaica
- Masteria lucifuga (Simon, 1889) – Venezuela
- Masteria luisi Rodríguez-Castro, Rodríguez & Delgado-Santa, 2025 – Colombia
- Masteria macgregori (Rainbow, 1898) – Papua New Guinea
- Masteria machay Dupérré & Tapia, 2021 – Ecuador
- Masteria manauara Bertani, Cruz & Oliveira, 2013 – Brazil
- Masteria modesta (Simon, 1892) – St. Vincent
- Masteria mutum Passanha & Brescovit, 2018 – Brazil
- Masteria otongachi Dupérré & Tapia, 2021 – Ecuador
- Masteria pallida (Kulczyński, 1908) – Papua New Guinea
- Masteria papallacta Dupérré & Tapia, 2021 – Ecuador
- Masteria pasochoa Dupérré & Tapia, 2021 – Ecuador
- Masteria pecki Gertsch, 1982 – Jamaica
- Masteria petrunkevitchi (Chickering, 1965) – Puerto Rico
- Masteria sabrinae Passanha & Brescovit, 2018 – Martinique
- Masteria simla (Chickering, 1967) – Trinidad
- Masteria soucouyant Passanha & Brescovit, 2018 – Trinidad and Tobago
- Masteria spinosa (Petrunkevitch, 1925) – Panama
- Masteria tayrona Passanha & Brescovit, 2018 – Colombia
- Masteria toddae Raven, 1979 – Australia (Queensland)
- Masteria urdujae Rasalan & Barrion-Dupo, 2019 – Philippines (Luzon)
- Masteria verdum Rodríguez-Castro, Rodríguez & Delgado-Santa, 2025 – Colombia
- Masteria yacambu Passanha & Brescovit, 2018 – Venezuela
Eye pattern of M. barona

M. downeyi

M. lewisi

M. petrunkevitchi

M. simla
