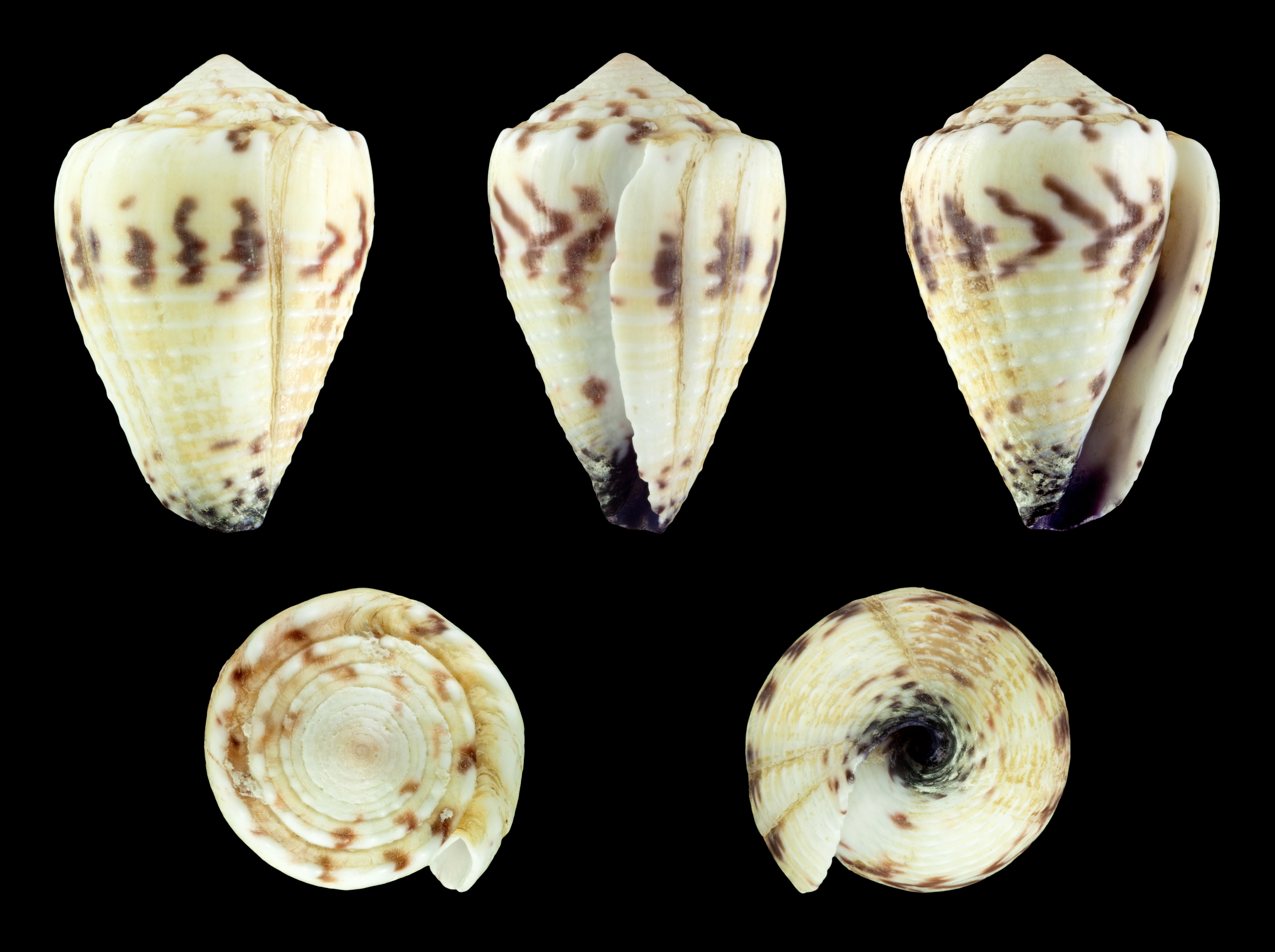
- A shell of Conus sponsalis Hwass in Bruguière, J.G., 1792

Conservation status
- Least Concern (IUCN 3.1)

Scientific classification
- Kingdom: Animalia
- Phylum: Mollusca
- Class: Gastropoda
- Subclass: Caenogastropoda
- Order: Neogastropoda
- Superfamily: Conoidea
- Family: Conidae
- Genus: Conus
- Species: C. sponsalis

Binomial name
- Conus sponsalis Hwass in Bruguière, 1792

Synonyms
- Conus (Harmoniconus) sponsalis Hwass in Bruguière, 1792 · accepted, alternate representation; Conus maculatus Bosc, 1801; Conus puncturatus Hwass in Bruguière, 1792; Harmoniconus sponsalis (Hwass in Bruguière, 1792)

= Conus sponsalis =

Species of sea snail

Conus sponsalis, common name the sponsal cone, is a species of sea snail, a marine gastropod mollusk in the family Conidae, the cone snails and their allies.

Like all species within the genus Conus, these snails are predatory and venomous. They are capable of stinging humans, therefore live ones should be handled carefully or not at all.

== Description ==
The size of the shell varies between 12 mm and 34 mm. The body whorl is somewhat convex on the sides, wide at the shoulder, which is somewhat rounded. its color is yellowish white, with a few chestnut or red zigzag longitudinal markings, forming an interrupted broad superior, and often a narrower inferior band. The base of the shell is violaceous.

== Distribution ==
This cone snail is found in Aldabra, Chagos, Mascarene Islands, Mozambique, the Red Sea and the West Coast of South Africa; also off New Zealand; off Australia (New South Wales, Northern Territory, Queensland and Western Australia).
