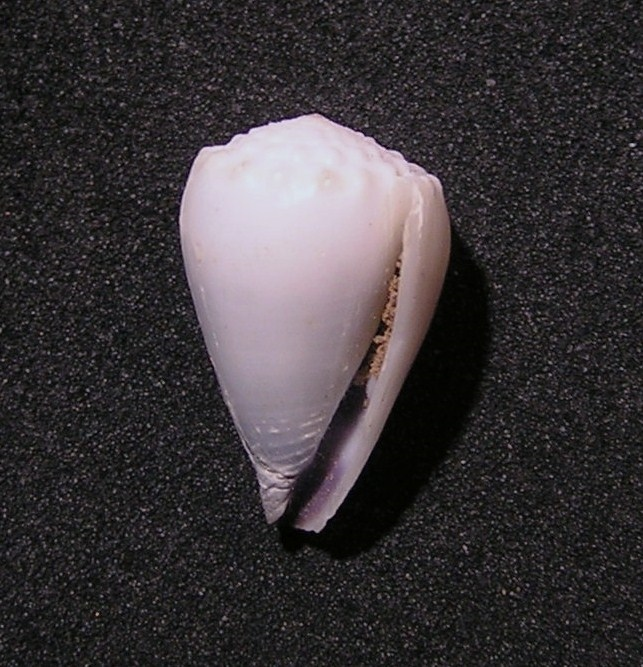
- Apertural view of Conus nanus

Scientific classification
- Kingdom: Animalia
- Phylum: Mollusca
- Class: Gastropoda
- Subclass: Caenogastropoda
- Order: Neogastropoda
- Superfamily: Conoidea
- Family: Conidae
- Genus: Conus
- Species: C. nanus

Binomial name
- Conus nanus G.B. Sowerby I, 1833

Synonyms
- Conus (Harmoniconus) nanus G. B. Sowerby I, 1833 · accepted, alternate representation; Conus sponsalis var nanus (G.B. Sowerby I, 1833); Harmoniconus nanus (G.B. Sowerby I, 1833)

= Conus nanus =

Species of sea snail

Conus nanus is a species of sea snail, a marine gastropod mollusk in the family Conidae, the cone snails and their allies.

These snails are predatory and venomous. They are capable of stinging humans, therefore live ones should be handled carefully or not at all.

== Description ==
The size of an adult shell varies between 12 mm and 34 mm. The shell is coronated, with a rather depressed spire, granular striae towards the base. The color of the shell is white, under a thin, light yellowish brown epidermis, obsoletely maculated or occasionally spotted with chestnut. The base is violaceous.

== Distribution ==
This species occurs in the Indian Ocean off the Mascarene Basin; in the Indo-Pacific Region off Hawaii, (Polynesia, Australia) South Africa

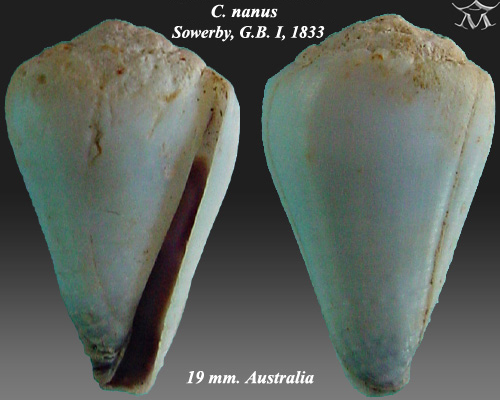
Conus nanus Sowerby, G.B. I, 1833

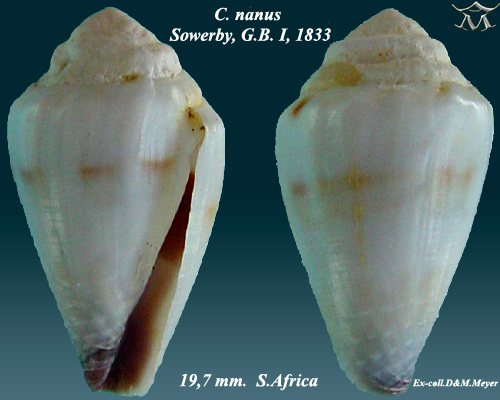
Conus nanus Sowerby, G.B. I, 1833
