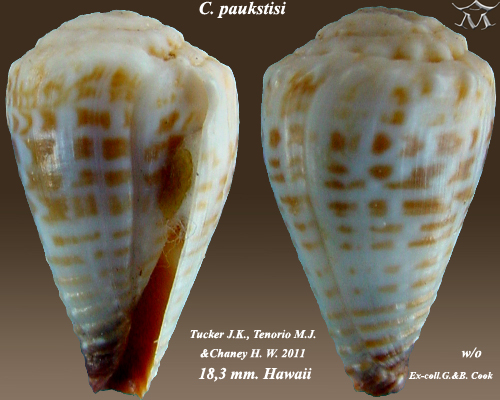
- Apertural and abapertural views of shell of Conus paukstisi Tucker J.K., Tenorio M.J. &Chaney H. W. 2011
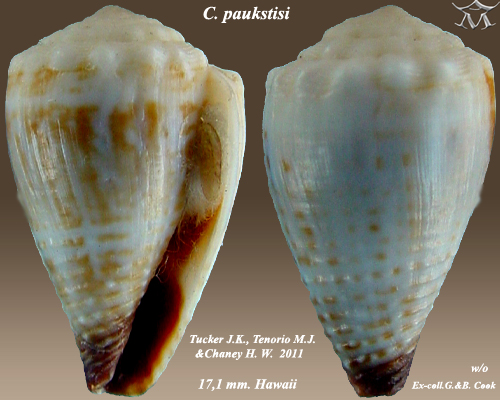

Scientific classification
- Kingdom: Animalia
- Phylum: Mollusca
- Class: Gastropoda
- Subclass: Caenogastropoda
- Order: Neogastropoda
- Superfamily: Conoidea
- Family: Conidae
- Genus: Conus
- Species: C. paukstisi

Binomial name
- Conus paukstisi (Tucker, Tenorio & Chaney, 2011)

Synonyms
- Conus (Harmoniconus) paukstisi (Tucker, Tenorio & Chaney, 2011) · accepted, alternate representation; Harmoniconus paukstisi Tucker, Tenorio & Chaney, 2011

= Conus paukstisi =

Species of sea snail

Conus paukstisi is a species of sea snail, a marine gastropod mollusk in the family Conidae, the cone snails, cone shells or cones.

These snails are predatory and venomous. They are capable of stinging humans.

== Description ==
The size of the shell varies between 9 mm and 35 mm. It features a golden-caramel pattern throughout the shell. Its whorls do not seem to taper towards the outside making it seem flatter at the top. It also has horizontal running costae.

== Distribution ==
This marine species occurs off Hawaii.
