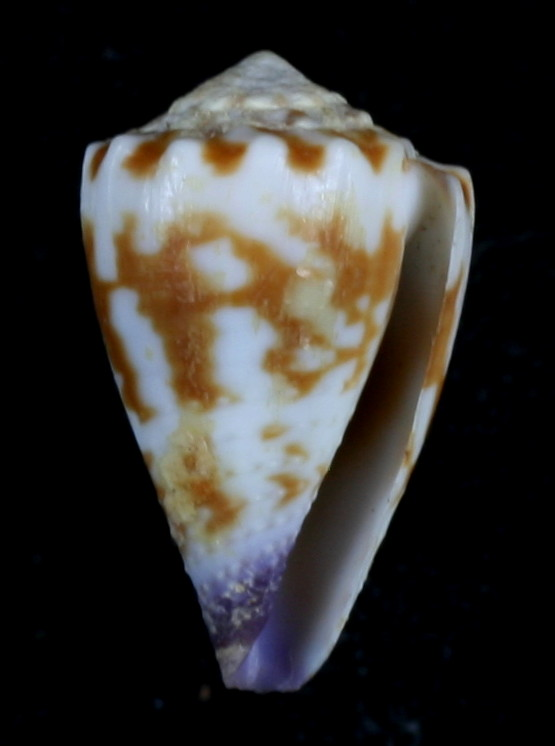
- Apertural view of shell of Conus nux Broderip, 1833, measuring 21.3 mm in height, collected at low tide in San Carlos Bay, Mexico

Conservation status
- Least Concern (IUCN 3.1)

Scientific classification
- Domain: Eukaryota
- Kingdom: Animalia
- Phylum: Mollusca
- Class: Gastropoda
- Subclass: Caenogastropoda
- Order: Neogastropoda
- Superfamily: Conoidea
- Family: Conidae
- Genus: Conus
- Species: C. nux

Binomial name
- Conus nux Broderip, 1833

Synonyms
- Conus (Harmoniconus) nux Broderip, 1833 · accepted, alternate representation; Conus ceylonensis Hwass; Conus pusillus Gould, 1853 (invalid: junior homonym of Conus pusillus Lamarck, 1810); Harmoniconus nux (Broderip, 1833)

= Conus nux =

Species of sea snail

Conus nux, common name the nut cone, is a species of sea snail, a marine gastropod mollusk in the family Conidae, the cone snails and their allies.

Like all species within the genus Conus, these snails are predatory and venomous. They are capable of stinging humans, therefore live ones should be handled carefully or not at all.

== Description ==
The size of the shell varies between 10 mm and 26 mm. The shell is coronated with a rather depressed spire. It is granular striate towards the base. Its color is white, variously marbled with chestnut, often obscurely white-banded at the upper part and below the middle of the body whorl. The base is tinged with violet.

== Distribution ==
This species occurs in the Pacific Ocean off Southwestern Baja California, Mexico to Ecuador; off the Galápagos Islands.

== Gallery ==
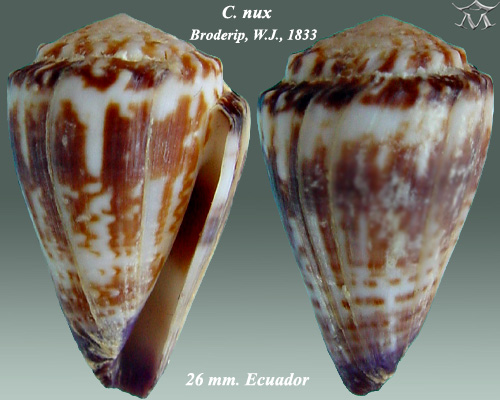
Conus nux Broderip, W.J., 1833

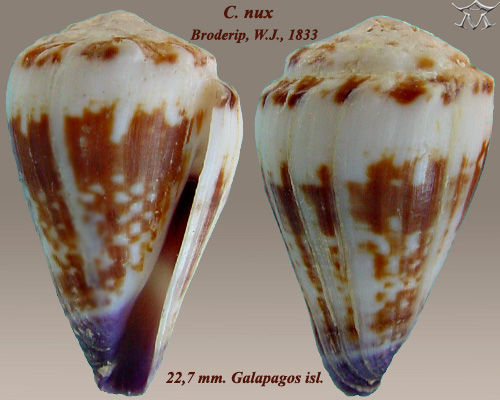
Conus nux Broderip, W.J., 1833

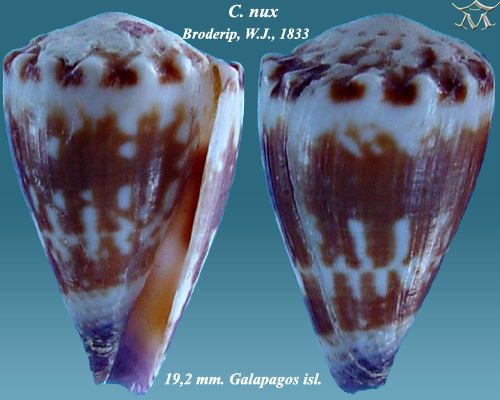
Conus nux Broderip, W.J., 1833

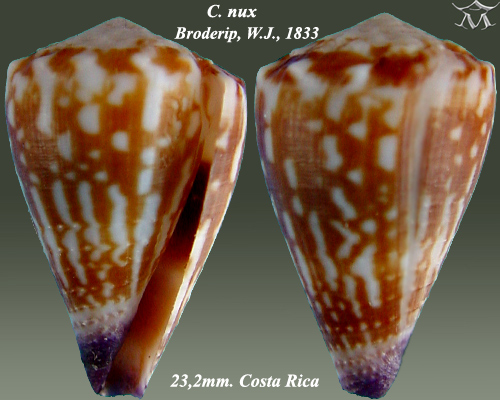
Conus nux Broderip, W.J., 1833
