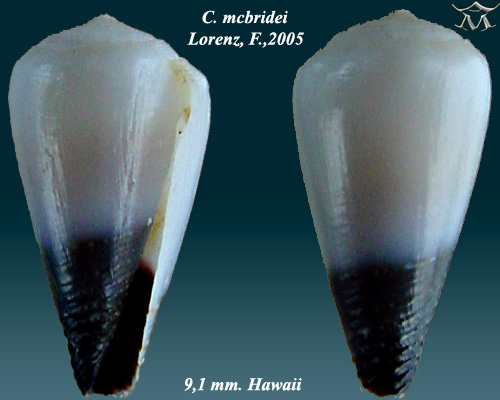
- Apertural and abapertural views of shell of Conus mcbridei Lorenz, F., 2005
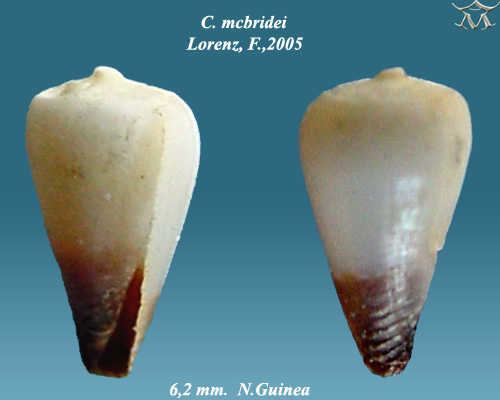

Scientific classification
- Kingdom: Animalia
- Phylum: Mollusca
- Class: Gastropoda
- Subclass: Caenogastropoda
- Order: Neogastropoda
- Superfamily: Conoidea
- Family: Conidae
- Genus: Conus
- Species: C. mcbridei

Binomial name
- Conus mcbridei Lorenz, 2005

Synonyms
- Conus (Harmoniconus) mcbridei Lorenz, 2005 · accepted, alternate representation; Harmoniconus mcbridei (Lorenz, 2005)

= Conus mcbridei =

Species of sea snail

Conus mcbridei is a species of sea snail, a marine gastropod mollusk in the family Conidae, the cone snails and their allies.

Like all species within the genus Conus, these snails are predatory and venomous. They are capable of stinging humans, therefore live ones should be handled carefully or not at all.

== Description ==
The size of the shell varies between 8.5 mm and 11 mm.

== Distribution ==
This marine species occurs off the Philippines, Maldives and Hawaii.
