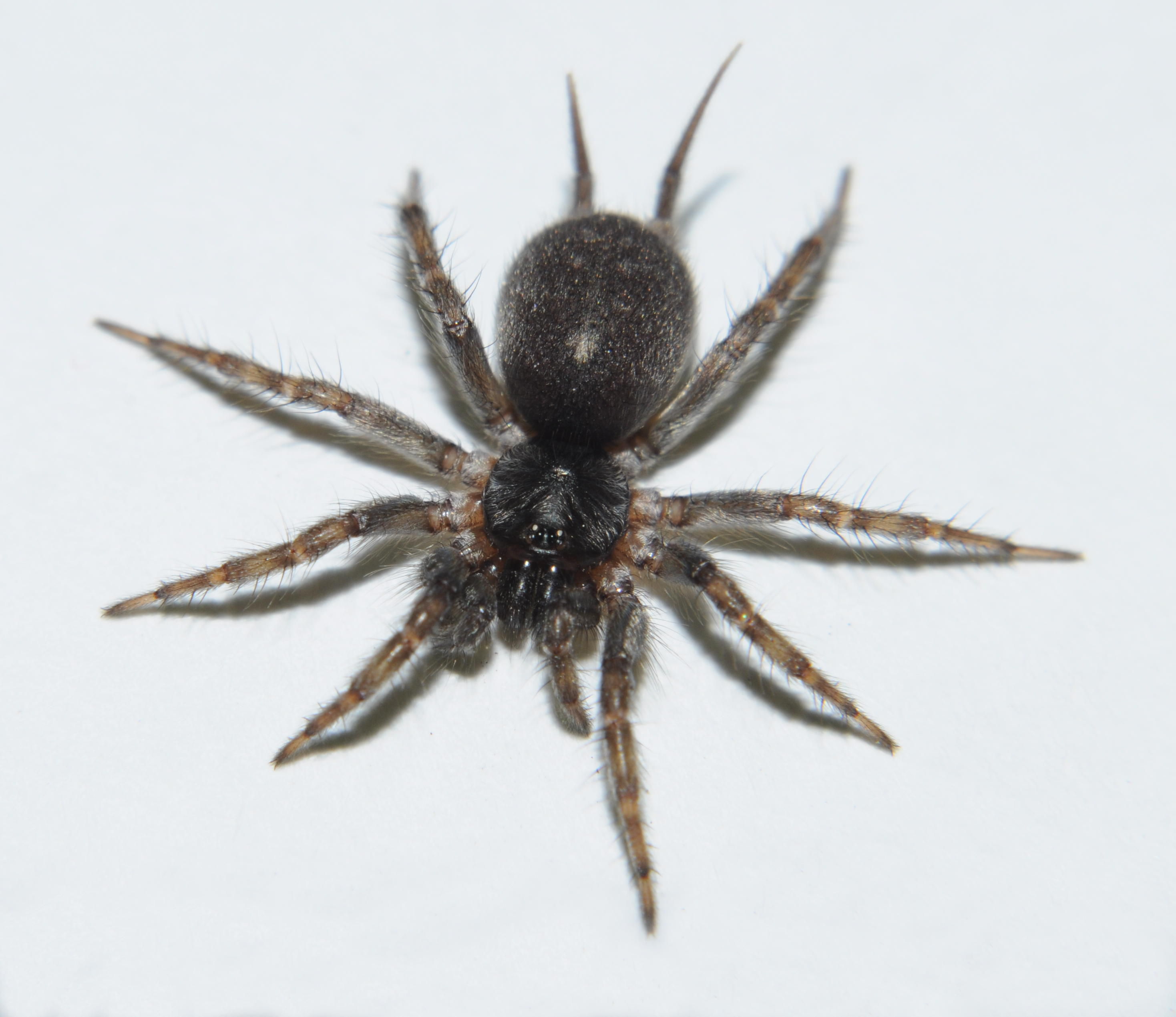
- Ischnothele caudata
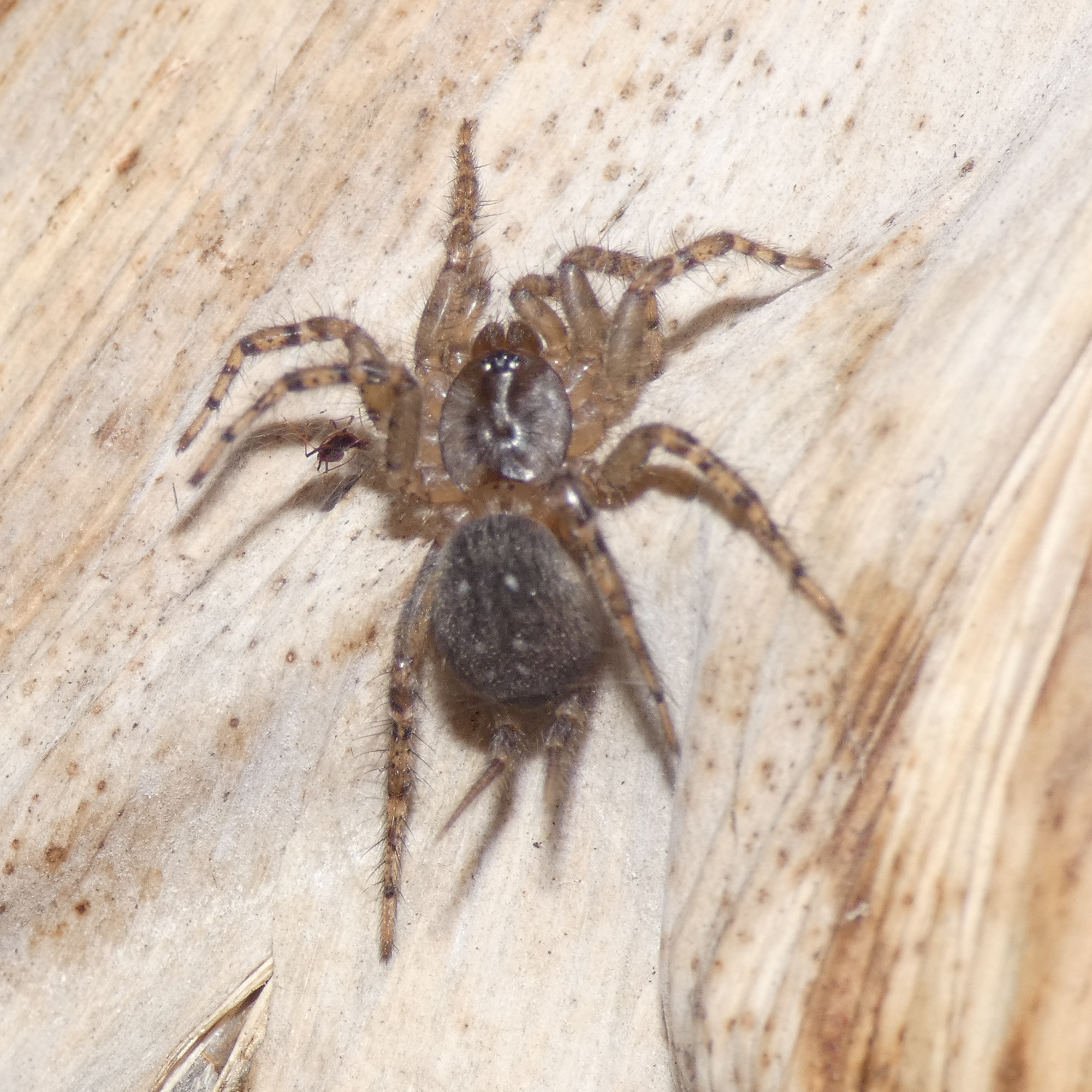
- Thelechoris striatipes from Zimbabwe

Scientific classification
- Kingdom: Animalia
- Phylum: Arthropoda
- Subphylum: Chelicerata
- Class: Arachnida
- Order: Araneae
- Infraorder: Mygalomorphae
- Clade: Avicularioidea
- Family: Ischnothelidae; F.O. P-Cambridge, 1897

Genera
- See text.
- blue: reported countries (WSC) green: observation hotspots (iNaturalist)

= Ischnothelidae =

Family of spiders

Ischnothelidae is a family of mygalomorph spiders. It was first described as a subfamily of the family Dipluridae by F.O. Pickard-Cambridge in 1897 and raised to a family by Opatova et al. in 2020.

== Genera ==
As of January 2026, this family includes six genera and 28 species:

- Andethele Coyle, 1995 – Peru
- Indothele Coyle, 1995 – India, Sri Lanka
- Ischnothele Ausserer, 1875 – Caribbean, South America
- Lathrothele Benoit, 1965 – Africa
- Tepuithele Dupérré & Tapia, 2025 – Ecuador
- Thelechoris Karsch, 1881 – Africa
