= Trechona =

Scientific classification
- Domain: Eukaryota
- Kingdom: Animalia
- Phylum: Arthropoda
- Subphylum: Chelicerata
- Class: Arachnida
- Order: Araneae
- Infraorder: Mygalomorphae
- Family: Dipluridae
- Genus: Trechona; C. L. Koch, 1850

Type species
- T. venosa (Latreille, 1832)

Species
- 9, see text

Synonyms
- Eudiplura Simon, 1892

Genus of spiders

Trechona is a genus of South American curtain web spiders that was first described by C. L. Koch in 1850. The venom of at least one species is considered potentially dangerous to humans.

== Description ==
Spiders of this genus grow up to 5 cm in length and are brownish to blackened, with a ''zebra'' coloring on the abdomen, with clear transverse bands. The lyre is composed of rigid bristles of different sizes. They are spiders of fossorial and nocturnal habits, found in tunnels dug in ravines and on top of logs or rocks in the forest. This species is very common in the Atlantic forest.

== Venom ==
Studies show that the venom of T. venosa is more potent than that of the Brazilian yellow scorpion (Tityus serrulatus). There have been few recorded accidents, possibly caused by T. rufa. The venom of T. venosa has a lethal dose of 0.070 mg for 20 grams rat by subcutaneous injection, and 0.030 mg by intravenous injection, 2 mg by intramuscular injection results in muscle contractions, paralysis and death in rats, while 0.4 mg results in death by tetanism, for pigeons, the lethal dose ranges from 0.01-0.007 mg, by intravenous injection. The average yield is 1.00 mg, and the maximum is 1.70 mg.

== Species ==
As of November 2024 it contains 9 species, all found in Brazil:

- Trechona adspersa Bertkau, 1880 – Brazil
- Trechona cotia Pedroso, de Miranda & Baptista, 2019 — Brazil
- Trechona diamantina Guadanuccia, Fonseca-Ferreira, Baptista & Pedroso, 2016 – Brazil
- Trechona excursora Pedroso, de Miranda & Baptista, 2019 — Brazil
- Trechona minuana Wermelinger-Moreira, Pedroso, Castanheira & Baptista, 2024 – Brazil
- Trechona munduruku Brescovit, Sherwood & Lucas, 2024 – Brazil
- Trechona rufa Vellard, 1924 – Brazil
- Trechona uniformis Mello-Leitão, 1935 – Brazil
- Trechona venosa (Latreille, 1832) (type) – Brazil
