= Ferdinand Karsch =

German biologist and anthropologist

Ferdinand Anton Franz Karsch
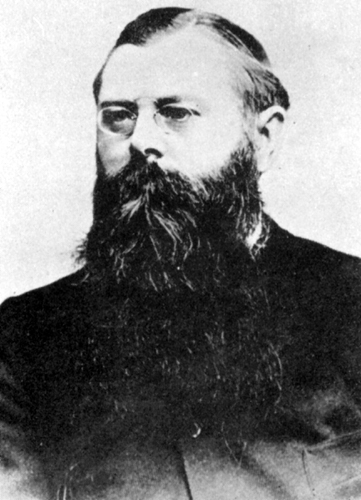
- Born: 2 September 1853; Münster, Germany
- Died: 20 December 1936 (aged 83); Berlin, Germany
- Education: Friedrich Wilhelm University, Berlin
- Occupations: Arachnologist, Entomologist, Anthropologist
- Employer(s): Museum für Naturkunde Berlin (Curator, 1878–1921)
- Known for: Extensive work on spiders, contributions to entomology, research on sexuality
- Notable work: Das gleichgeschlechtliche Leben der Kulturvölker (1906), Das gleichgeschlechtliche Leben der Naturvölker (1911)
- Scientific career
- Author abbrev. (zoology): Karsch

Ferdinand Anton Franz Karsch (2 September 1853, in Münster – 20 December 1936, in Berlin) was a German arachnologist, entomologist and anthropologist. He also wrote on human and animal sexual diversity with his mother's maiden name included as Ferdinand Karsch-Haack from around 1905.

== Life and work ==
The son of doctor Anton Karsch, he was educated at the Friedrich Wilhelm University in Berlin and published a thesis on the gall wasp in 1877. From 1878 to 1921 he held the post of curator at the Museum für Naturkunde Berlin. Between 1873 and 1893, he published a catalogue of the spiders of Westphalia; he also published numerous articles on the specimens that the museum received from various explorers and naturalists working in Africa, in China, in Japan, in Australia, etc. This publication of others' work sometimes led to disputes over priority and nomenclature, for example with Pickard-Cambridge.

Alongside his zoological activities, he published many works on sexuality and, in particular, homosexuality in both the animal kingdom and in so-called "primitive" peoples, including Das gleichgeschlechtliche Leben der Kulturvölker – Ostasiaten: Chinesen, Japanese, Korea in 1906 on homosexuality in East Asian societies and in 1911 Das gleichgeschlechtliche Leben der Naturvölker on homosexuality in Africa and indigenous societies of Asia, Australia and the Americas. Karsch lived in later life as an open homosexual in Berlin. He also founded and edited a magazine along with René Stelter called Uranos. Blätter für ungeschmälertes Menschentum (1921–23) where he wrote on his scientific ideas. The rise of Hitler to power and Nazi repression of homosexuality led to the eclipse of his reputation.

== Some of the animals described ==
=== Spiders ===
- Misgolas 1878 – New South Wales, Australia
- Portia schultzi 1878 — Central, East, Southern Africa, Madagascar
- Holothele 1879 – Venezuela
- Linothele 1879 — South America
- Sphaerobothria 1879 – Costa Rica
- Thelechoris 1881 — Africa, Madagascar
- Tribe Diplocentrini 1880
- Acontius 1879 — Africa
- Heterothele 1879 – Africa Congo
- Pedinopistha 1880 – Hawaii
- Campostichomma 1891 — Sri Lanka (one species)
- Corinnomma 1880
- Megalostrata 1880
- Chilobrachys 1892
- Myrmarachne

=== Other animals ===
- Potamarcha (1890)

== About homosexuality ==
- Das gleichgeschlechtliche Leben der Naturvölker, 1911, online at archive.org
- Karsch, F. (2024). The Same-Sex Life of Indigenous Peoples. 2 Parts. (M. Lombardi-Nash, Trans.). Jacksonville, FL: Urania Manuscripts. (Original work published 1911)
- Karsch, F. (2022). Karl Heinrich Ulrichs' predecessor Heinrich Hössli (1784–1864): The first known literary activist and parent of a gay man. (M. Lombardi-Nash, Trans.). Jacksonville, FL: Urania Manuscripts. (Original work published 1903)
- Karsch, F. (2021). Male and female homosexuality in animals on the basis of literature. (M. Lombardi-Nash, Trans.). Jacksonville, FL: Urania Manuscripts. (Original work published 1900)

== Literature ==
- Robert Aldrich, Garry Wotherspoon, Who's Who in Gay and Lesbian History: From Antiquity to World War II (2nd ed), Routledge, 2002, ISBN 0-415-15983-0, pp. 281–282.
- Hergemöller, Bernd-Ulrich (2001). Mann für Mann: biographisches Lexikon (in German). Suhrkamp. pp. 410–411.
