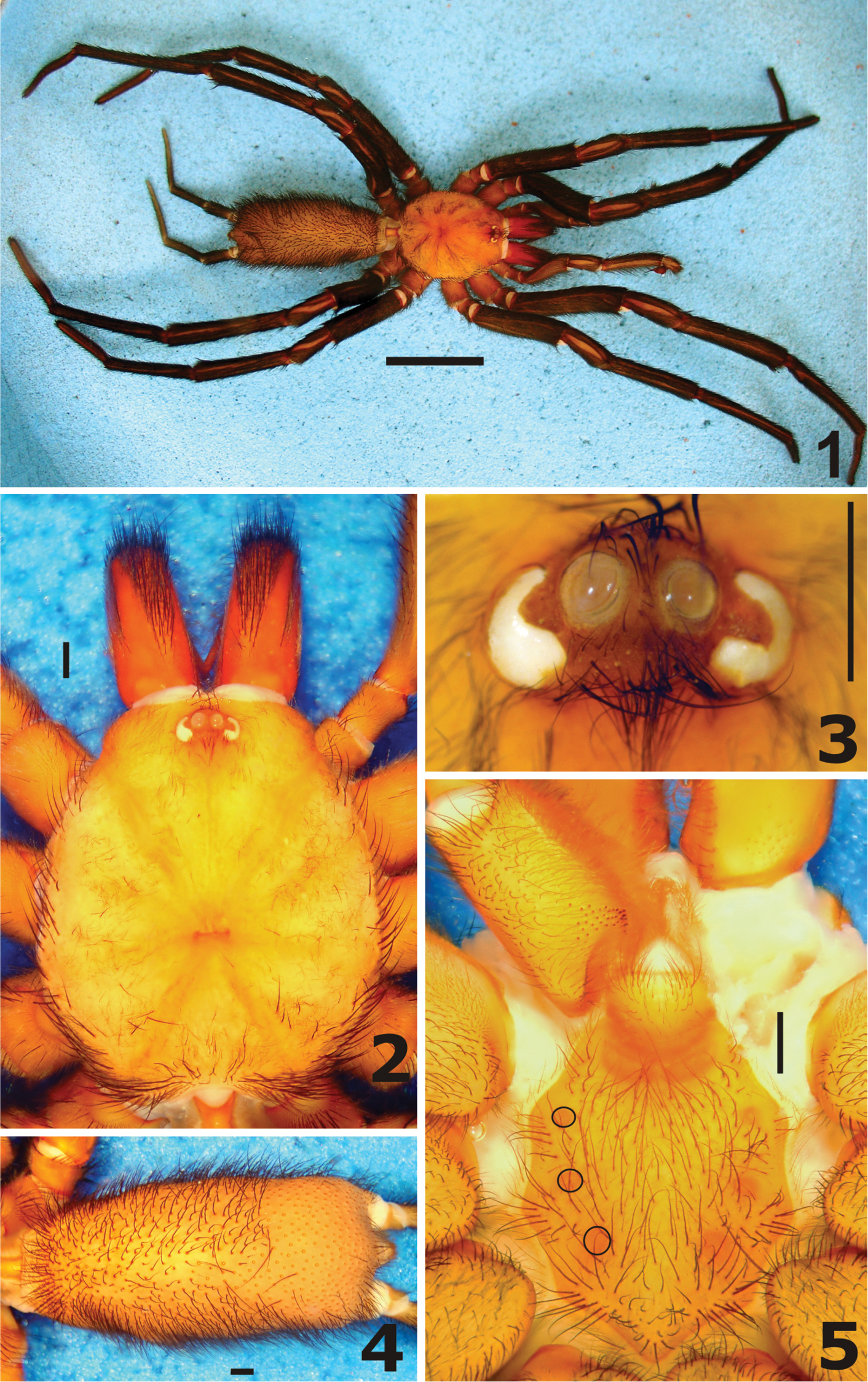
- H. cerberus

Scientific classification
- Domain: Eukaryota
- Kingdom: Animalia
- Phylum: Arthropoda
- Subphylum: Chelicerata
- Class: Arachnida
- Order: Araneae
- Infraorder: Mygalomorphae
- Family: Dipluridae
- Genus: Harmonicon; F. O. Pickard-Cambridge, 1896

Type species
- H. rufescens F. O. Pickard-Cambridge, 1896

Species
- 5, see text

= Harmonicon (spider) =

Genus of spiders

Harmonicon is a genus of South American curtain web spiders that was first described by F. O. Pickard-Cambridge in 1896.

== Species ==
As of April 2025 it contains five species:

- Harmonicon audeae Maréchal & Marty, 1998 – French Guiana
- Harmonicon candango Wermelinger-Moreira, G., Castanheira, P. S., & Baptista, R. L. C. (2024) – Cerrado, Brazil
- Harmonicon cerberus Pedroso & Baptista, 2014 – Brazil
- Harmonicon oiapoqueae Drolshagen & Bäckstam, 2011 – French Guiana
- Harmonicon rufescens F. O. Pickard-Cambridge, 1896 (type) – Brazil
