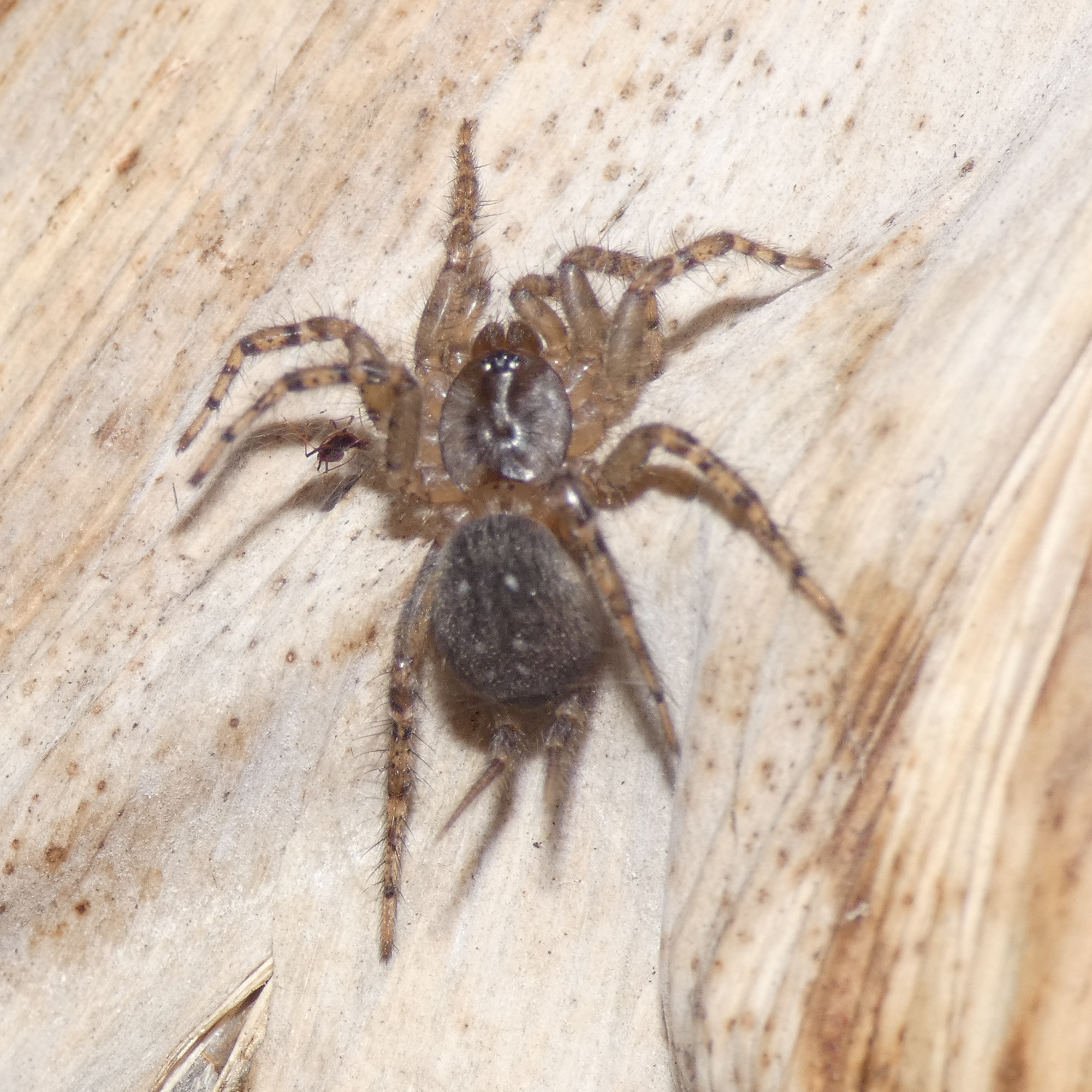
- T. striatipes
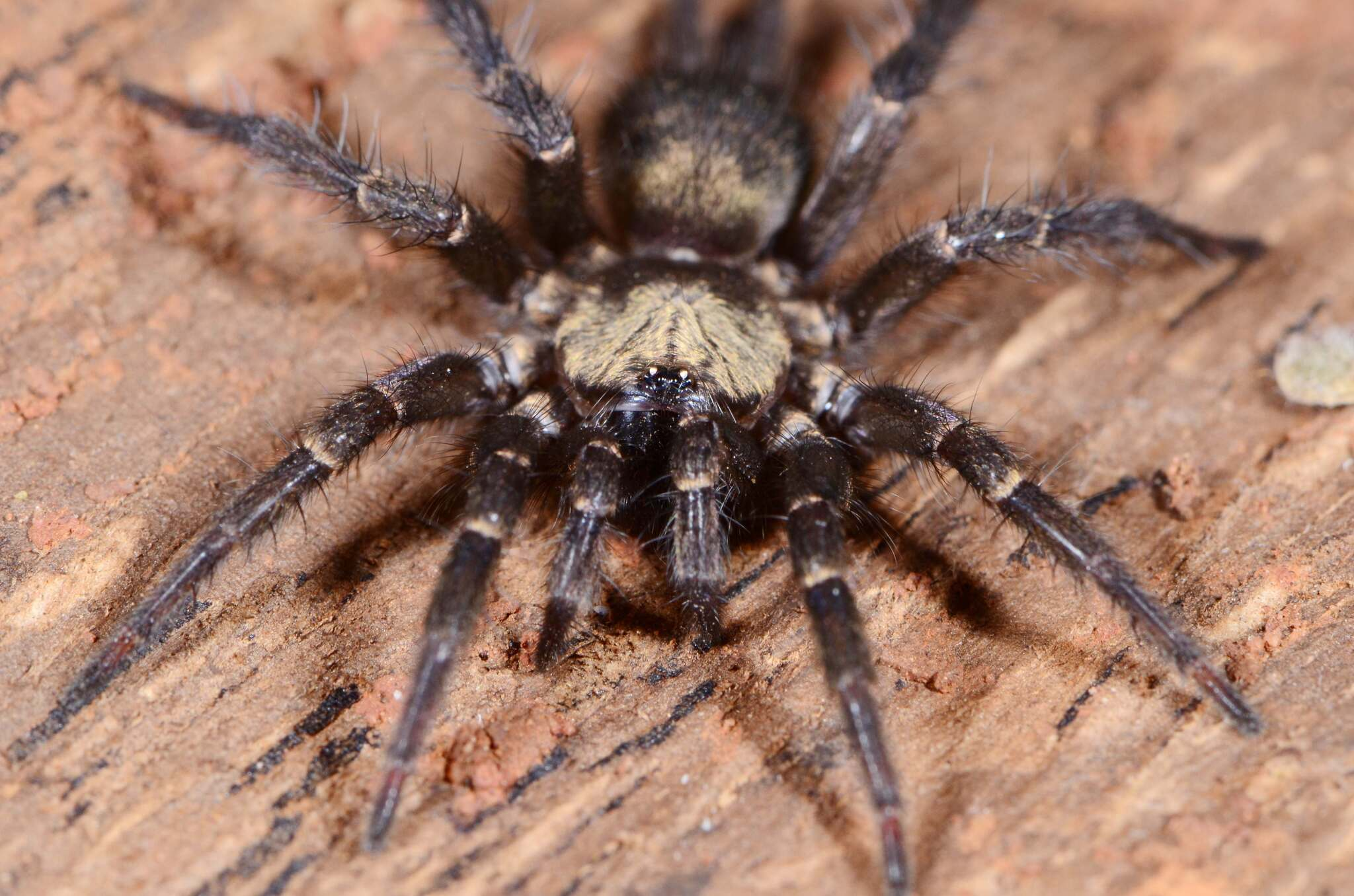
- female T. striatipes

Scientific classification
- Kingdom: Animalia
- Phylum: Arthropoda
- Subphylum: Chelicerata
- Class: Arachnida
- Order: Araneae
- Infraorder: Mygalomorphae
- Family: Ischnothelidae
- Genus: Thelechoris; Karsch, 1881

Type species
- T. rutenbergi Karsch, 1881

Species
- Thelechoris rutenbergi Karsch, 1881; Thelechoris striatipes Simon, 1889

= Thelechoris =

Genus of spiders

Thelechoris is a genus of East African spiders in the family Ischnothelidae, with two species. It was first described by Ferdinand Karsch in 1881.

== Species ==
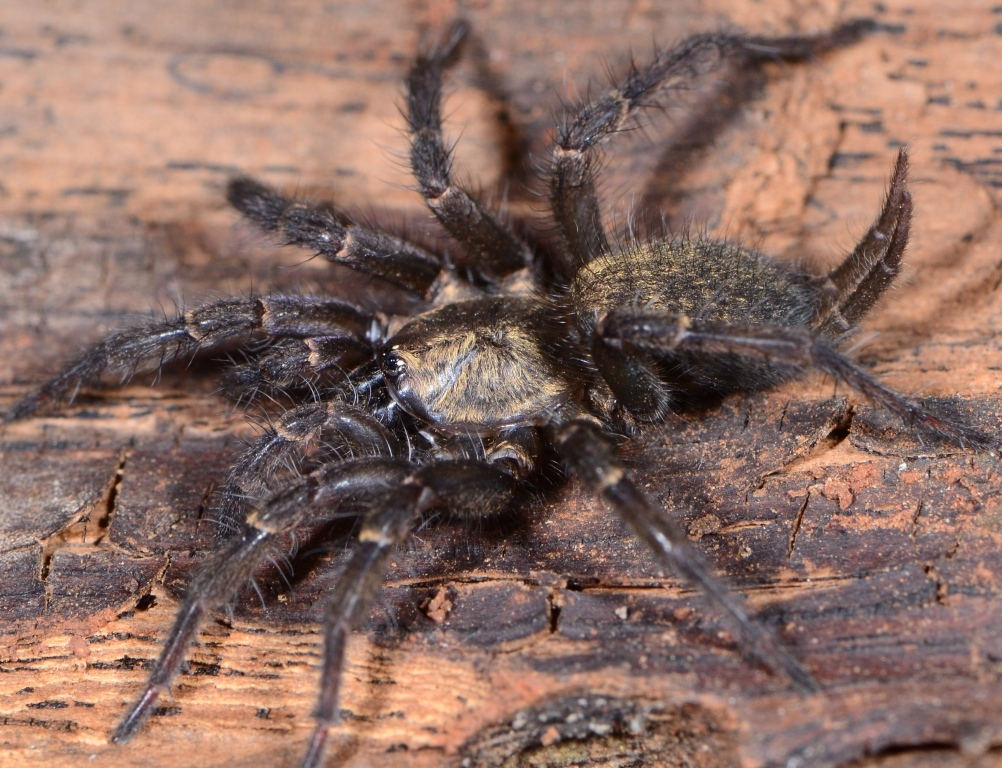
female T. striatipes

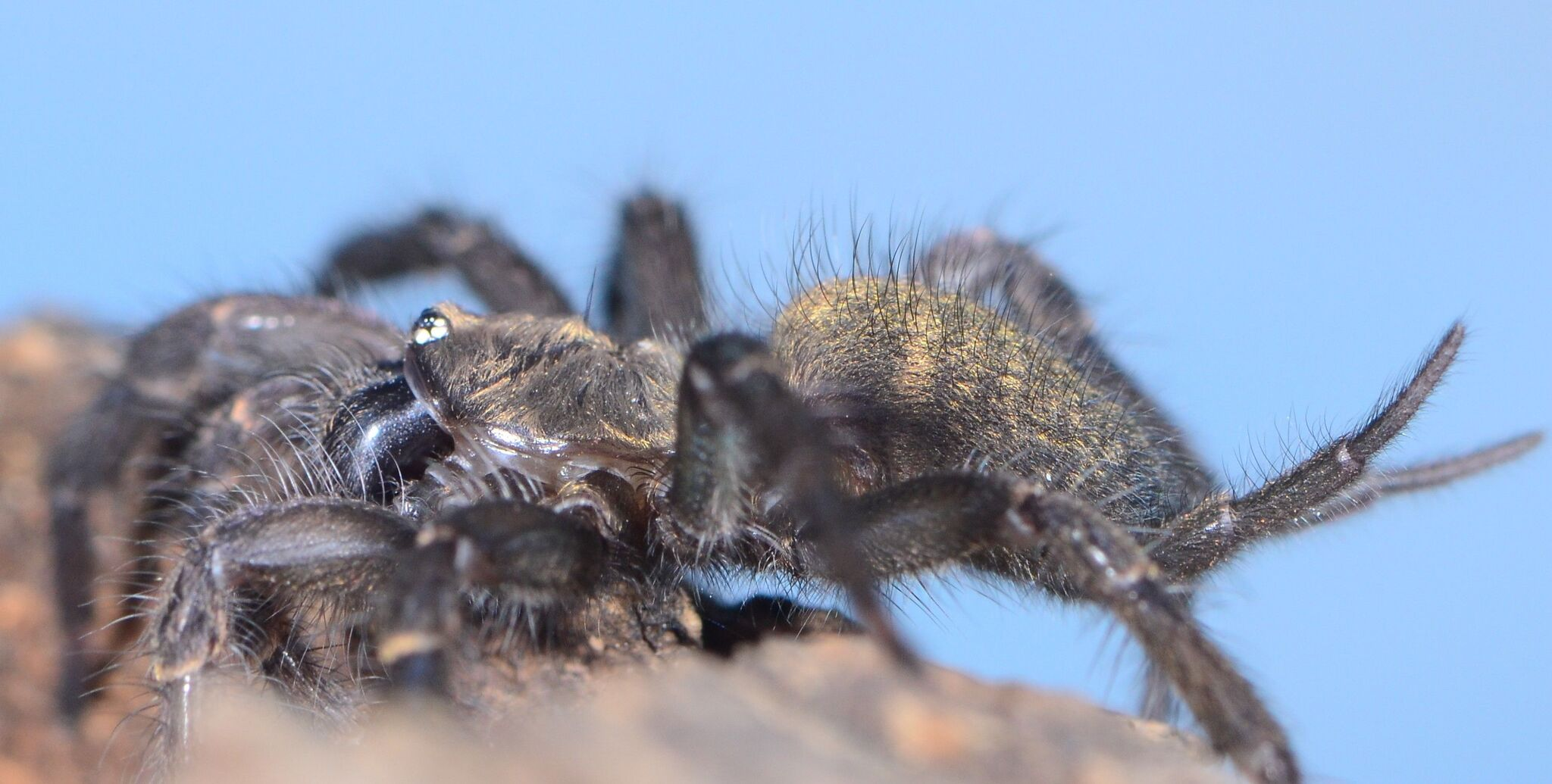
female T. striatipes

As of October 2025, this genus includes two species:

- Thelechoris rutenbergi Karsch, 1881 – Madagascar (type species)
- Thelechoris striatipes (Simon, 1889) – Zambia, Malawi, Namibia, Botswana, Zimbabwe, Mozambique, South Africa, Madagascar
