= Indothele =

Scientific classification
- Domain: Eukaryota
- Kingdom: Animalia
- Phylum: Arthropoda
- Subphylum: Chelicerata
- Class: Arachnida
- Order: Araneae
- Infraorder: Mygalomorphae
- Family: Ischnothelidae
- Genus: Indothele; Coyle, 1995

Type species
- I. dumicola (Pocock, 1900)

Species
- See text.

Genus of spiders

Indothele is a genus of Asian spiders in the family Ischnothelidae. It was first described by F. A. Coyle in 1995.

== Species ==
As of July 2020 it contained the following species:

- Indothele dumicola (Pocock, 1900) (type) – India
- Indothele lanka Coyle, 1995 – Sri Lanka
- Indothele mala Coyle, 1995 – India
- Indothele rothi Coyle, 1995 – India
