= Lathrothele =

Scientific classification
- Kingdom: Animalia
- Phylum: Arthropoda
- Subphylum: Chelicerata
- Class: Arachnida
- Order: Araneae
- Infraorder: Mygalomorphae
- Family: Ischnothelidae
- Genus: Lathrothele; Benoit, 1965

Type species
- L. grabensis Benoit, 1965

Species
- See text.

Genus of spiders

Lathrothele is a genus of African spiders in the family Ischnothelidae. It was first described by Pierre L.G. Benoit in 1965.

== Species ==
As of July 2020 it contained the following species:

- Lathrothele catamita (Simon, 1907) – São Tomé and Príncipe
- Lathrothele cavernicola Benoit, 1965 – Congo
- Lathrothele grabensis Benoit, 1965 (type) – Cameroon, Congo, Rwanda, Burundi
- Lathrothele jezequeli Benoit, 1965 – Ivory Coast
- Lathrothele mitonae Bäckstam, Drolshagen & Seiter, 2013 – Gabon
