= Andethele =

Scientific classification
- Domain: Eukaryota
- Kingdom: Animalia
- Phylum: Arthropoda
- Subphylum: Chelicerata
- Class: Arachnida
- Order: Araneae
- Infraorder: Mygalomorphae
- Family: Ischnothelidae
- Genus: Andethele; Coyle, 1995

Type species
- A. huanca Coyle, 1995

Species
- Andethele huanca Coyle, 1995; Andethele lucma Coyle, 1995; Andethele tarma Coyle, 1995

Genus of spiders

Andethele is a genus of South American spiders in the family Ischnothelidae. It was first described by F. A. Coyle in 1995. As of July 2020 it contained only three species, all found in Peru: A. huanca, A. lucma, and A. tarma.
