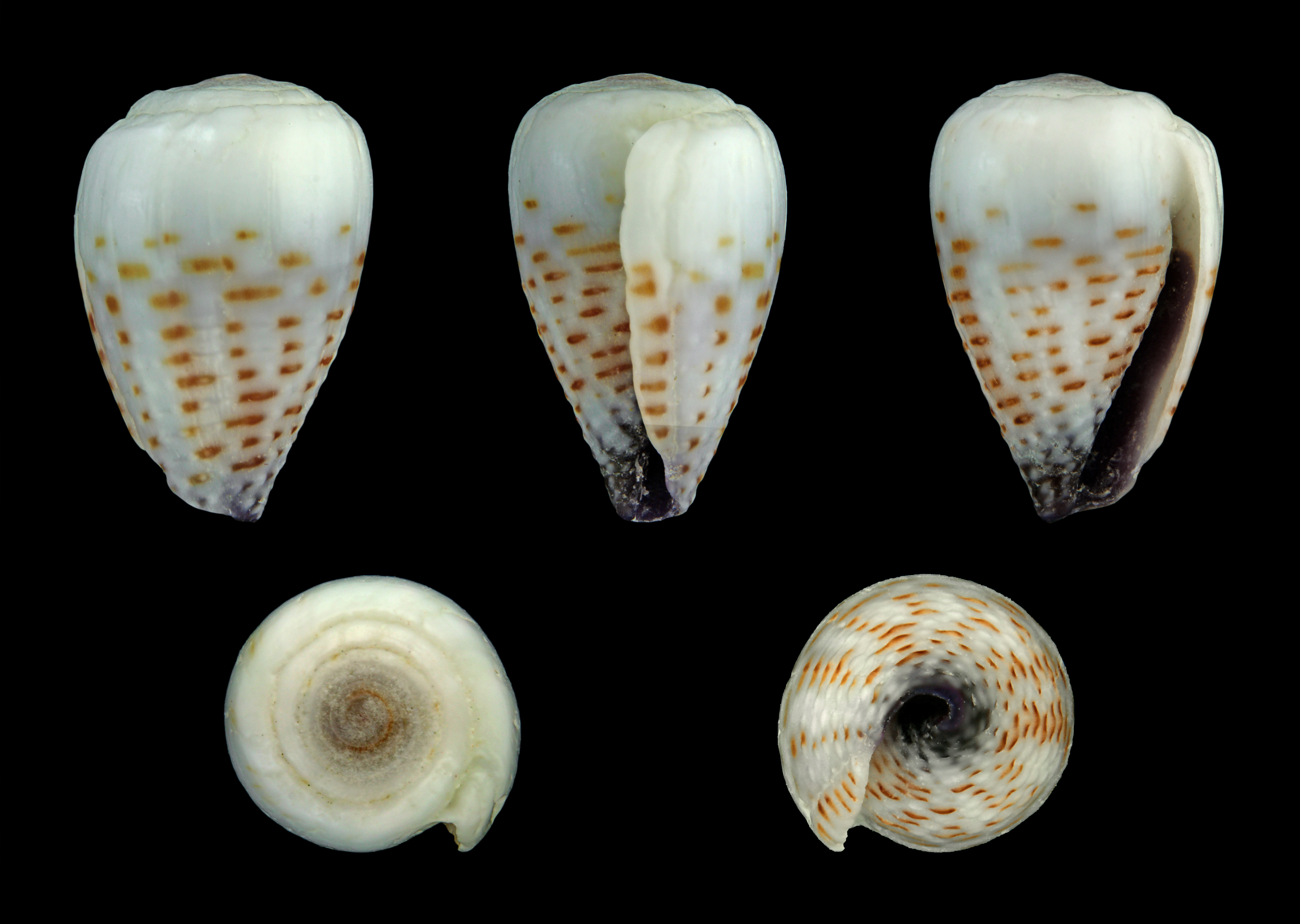
- Five views of a shell of Conus parvatus Walls, J.G., 1979

Scientific classification
- Kingdom: Animalia
- Phylum: Mollusca
- Class: Gastropoda
- Subclass: Caenogastropoda
- Order: Neogastropoda
- Superfamily: Conoidea
- Family: Conidae
- Genus: Conus
- Species: C. parvatus

Binomial name
- Conus parvatus Walls, 1979

Synonyms
- Conus (Harmoniconus) parvatus Walls, 1979 · accepted, alternate representation; Conus musicus parvatus Walls, 1979 (original rank); Conus parvatus sharmiensis Wils, 1986; Conus pusillus Reeve, 1843 (invalid: junior homonym of Conus pusillus Lamarck, 1810); Conus pusillus G. B. Sowerby II, 1857 (invalid: junior homonym of Conus pusillus Lamarck, 1810); Harmoniconus parvatus (Walls, 1979)

= Conus parvatus =

Species of sea snail

Conus parvatus is a species of sea snail, a marine gastropod mollusk in the family Conidae, the cone snails and their allies.

Like all species within the genus Conus, these snails are predatory and venomous. They are capable of stinging humans, therefore live ones should be handled carefully or not at all.

The subspecies Conus parvatus sharmiensis Wils, 1986 is a synonym of Conus parvatus Walls, 1979

== Description ==
The size of the shell varies between 10 mm and 30 mm.

== Distribution ==
This marine species occurs in the Red Sea, the Mascarene Basin, off North Transkei, off Western Thailand, Indian Ocean Maldives.
