= List of Euagridae species =

This page lists all described species of the spider family Euagridae accepted by the World Spider Catalog as of February 2021:

== A ==
=== Allothele ===
Allothele Tucker, 1920

- A. australis (Purcell, 1903) — South Africa
- A. caffer (Pocock, 1902) (type) — South Africa
- A. malawi Coyle, 1984 — Malawi, South Africa
- A. regnardi (Benoit, 1964) — Congo, Angola
- A. teretis Tucker, 1920 — South Africa

=== Australothele ===
Australothele Raven, 1984

- A. bicuspidata Raven, 1984 — Australia (New South Wales)
- A. jamiesoni Raven, 1984 — Australia (Queensland, New South Wales)
- A. maculata Raven, 1984 (type) — Australia (Queensland)
- A. magna Raven, 1984 — Australia (Queensland)
- A. montana Raven, 1984 — Australia (New South Wales)
- A. nambucca Raven, 1984 — Australia (New South Wales)
- A. nothofagi Raven, 1984 — Australia (Queensland, New South Wales)

== C ==
=== Caledothele ===
Caledothele Raven, 1991

- C. annulatus (Raven, 1981) — New Caledonia, Loyalty Is.
- C. aoupinie Raven, 1991 — New Caledonia
- C. australiensis (Raven, 1984) (type) — Australia (Victoria)
- C. carina Raven, 1991 — New Caledonia
- C. elegans Raven, 1991 — New Caledonia
- C. tonta Raven, 1991 — New Caledonia
- C. tristata Raven, 1991 — New Caledonia

=== Carrai ===
Carrai Raven, 1984

- C. afoveolata Raven, 1984 (type) — Australia (New South Wales)

=== Cethegus ===
Cethegus Thorell, 1881

- C. barraba Raven, 1984 — Australia (New South Wales)
- C. broomi (Hogg, 1901) — Australia (New South Wales)
- C. colemani Raven, 1984 — Australia (Queensland)
- C. daemeli Raven, 1984 — Australia (Queensland)
- C. elegans Raven, 1984 — Australia (Queensland)
- C. fugax (Simon, 1908) — Australia (Western Australia, South Australia)
- C. hanni Raven, 1984 — Australia (Queensland)
- C. ischnotheloides Raven, 1985 — Australia (South Australia)
- C. lugubris Thorell, 1881 (type) — Australia (Queensland)
- C. multispinosus Raven, 1984 — Australia (Queensland)
- C. pallipes Raven, 1984 — Australia (Queensland)
- C. robustus Raven, 1984 — Australia (Queensland)

=== Chilehexops ===
Chilehexops Coyle, 1986

- C. australis (Mello-Leitão, 1939) — Chile
- C. misionensis Goloboff, 1989 — Argentina
- C. platnicki Coyle, 1986 (type) — Chile

== E ==
=== Euagrus ===
Euagrus

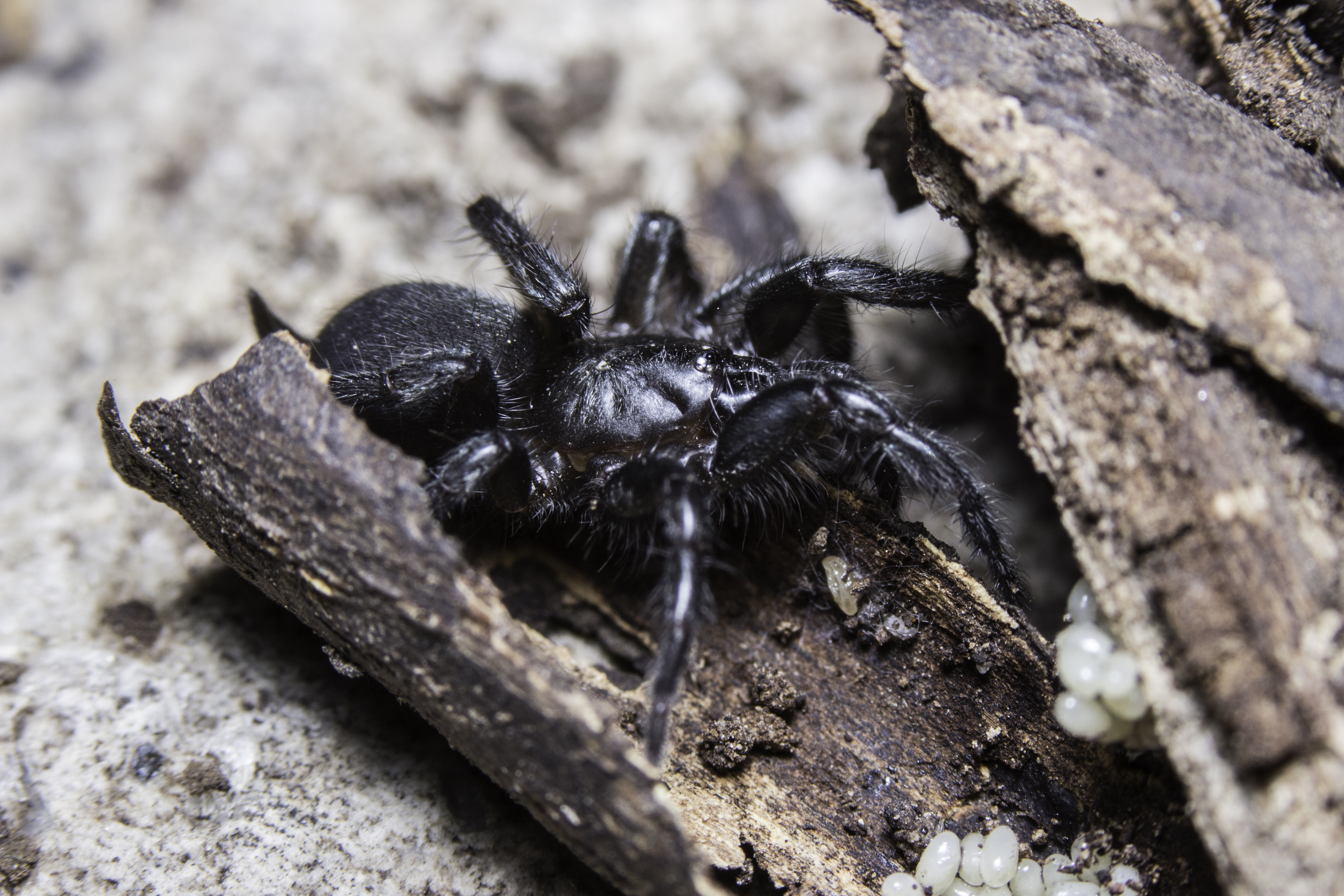
Euagrus sp.

Euagrus Ausserer, 1875

- E. anops Gertsch, 1973 — Mexico
- E. atropurpureus Purcell, 1903 — South Africa
- E. carlos Coyle, 1988 — Mexico to Costa Rica
- E. cavernicola Gertsch, 1971 — Mexico
- E. charcus Coyle, 1988 — Mexico
- E. chisoseus Gertsch, 1939 — USA, Mexico
- E. comstocki Gertsch, 1935 — USA
- E. formosanus Saito, 1933 — Taiwan
- E. garnicus Coyle, 1988 — Mexico
- E. gertschi Coyle, 1988 — Mexico
- E. guatemalensis F. O. Pickard-Cambridge, 1897 — Guatemala
- E. gus Coyle, 1988 — Mexico
- E. josephus Chamberlin, 1924 — Mexico
- E. leones Coyle, 1988 — Mexico
- E. luteus Gertsch, 1973 — Mexico
- E. lynceus Brignoli, 1974 — Mexico, Guatemala
- E. mexicanus Ausserer, 1875 (type) — Mexico
- E. pristinus O. Pickard-Cambridge, 1899 — Mexico
- E. rothi Coyle, 1988 — USA
- E. rubrigularis Simon, 1890 — Mexico
- E. troglodyta Gertsch, 1982 — Mexico
- E. zacus Coyle, 1988 — Mexico

== L ==
=== Leptothele ===
Leptothele Raven & Schwendinger, 1995

- L. bencha Raven & Schwendinger, 1995 (type) — Thailand
- L. chang Schwendinger, 2020 — Thailand

== M ==
=== Malayathele ===
Malayathele Schwendinger, 2020

- M. cameronensis Schwendinger, 2020 — Malaysia (Peninsula)
- M. kanching Schwendinger, 2020 (type) — Malaysia (Peninsula)
- M. maculosa Schwendinger, 2020 — Malaysia (Peninsula)
- M. ulu Schwendinger, 2020 — Malaysia (Peninsula)

== N ==
=== Namirea ===
Namirea Raven, 1984

- N. dougwallacei Raven, 1993 — Australia (Queensland)
- N. eungella Raven, 1984 — Australia (Queensland)
- N. fallax Raven, 1984 — Australia (New South Wales)
- N. insularis Raven, 1984 — Australia (Queensland)
- N. johnlyonsi Raven, 1993 — Australia (Queensland)
- N. montislewisi Raven, 1984 — Australia (Queensland)
- N. planipes Raven, 1984 (type) — Australia (Queensland)

== P ==
=== Phyxioschema ===
Phyxioschema Simon, 1889

- P. erawan Schwendinger, 2009 — Thailand
- P. eripnastes Schwendinger, 2009 — Thailand
- P. gedrosia Schwendinger & Zamani, 2018 — Iran
- P. huberi Schwendinger, 2009 — Thailand
- P. raddei Simon, 1889 (type) — Kazakhstan, Iran, Afghanistan, Uzbekistan, Turkmenistan, Tajikistan
- P. roxana Schwendinger & Zonstein, 2011 — Uzbekistan, Tajikistan
- P. sayamense Schwendinger, 2009 — Thailand
- P. spelaeum Schwendinger, 2009 — Thailand
- P. suthepium Raven & Schwendinger, 1989 — Thailand

== S ==
=== Stenygrocercus ===
Stenygrocercus Simon, 1892

- S. alphoreus Raven, 1991 — New Caledonia
- S. franzi Raven, 1991 — New Caledonia
- S. kresta Raven, 1991 — New Caledonia
- S. recineus Raven, 1991 — New Caledonia
- S. silvicola (Simon, 1889) (type) — New Caledonia
- S. simoni Raven, 1991 — New Caledonia

== V ==
=== Vilchura ===
Vilchura Ríos-Tamayo & Goloboff, 2017

- V. calderoni Ríos-Tamayo & Goloboff, 2017 (type) — Chile
