= Allothele australis =

Conservation status
- Least Concern (IUCN 3.1)

Scientific classification
- Kingdom: Animalia
- Phylum: Arthropoda
- Subphylum: Chelicerata
- Class: Arachnida
- Order: Araneae
- Infraorder: Mygalomorphae
- Family: Euagridae
- Genus: Allothele
- Species: A. australis

Binomial name
- Allothele australis (Purcell, 1903)

Synonyms
- Thelechoris australis Purcell, 1903; Evagrus caffer australis (Purcell, 1903)

Species of spider

Allothele australis is a species of mygalomorph spider in the family Euagridae. It is endemic to South Africa, where it is commonly known as the Eastern Cape's sheet-web spider.

== Taxonomy ==
The species was originally described by W. F. Purcell in 1903 as Thelechoris australis from specimens collected at Dunbrody in the Eastern Cape. It was later transferred to the genus Euagrus by Hewitt in 1919, who treated it as a variety of Euagrus caffer. The species was subsequently moved to its current genus Allothele and restored to full species status by Coyle in 1984, who removed it from synonymy with A. caffer.

== Distribution ==
Allothele australis is found in the Eastern Cape and Western Cape provinces of South Africa. The species has an extent of occurrence of 56,580 km^{2} and an area of occupancy of 48 km^{2}, occurring at elevations ranging from 37 to 1,652 metres above sea level.

In the Eastern Cape, it has been recorded from locations including Addo Elephant National Park, Baviaanskloof Nature Reserve, Cookhouse, Grahamstown, Dunbrody along the Sundays River, Peddie, and several nature reserves including Mpofu and Tsolwana. In the Western Cape, it is known from Swartberg Nature Reserve and Somerset West.

== Habitat ==
Allothele australis constructs sheet-webs with funnel retreats, typically located beneath stones and in rock crevices. The species inhabits three major biomes: Fynbos, Thicket, and Savanna.

== Description ==
Females of A. australis can be distinguished by their chelicerae having large and small teeth arranged alternately in a well-defined row, with a few minute denticles forming an outer row near the base.

Males have distinctive characteristics of the pedipalps, with the palpal bulb being pyriform and passing gradually into a spine that tapers to a point at the apex. The basal part of the spine is broadly curved.

The tarsus is short and lacks spines, while the tibia is longer than the patella and is expanded below. The tibia is covered with long curved stout bristles or setiform spines on all surfaces except on each side in the proximal half. Males also possess a strong, forwardly projecting process on the anteroinferior edge of tibia II, bearing two to five black, sharp-pointed, claw-like tubercles.

The opisthosoma has numerous long, outstanding, bristly setae as well as golden hairs, and similar stout setae occur on the legs.

== Conservation ==
Allothele australis is listed as Least Concern by the IUCN Red List. Although the species faces threats from habitat loss due to urbanization and farming activities, particularly around Peddie, Grahamstown, Somerset West, and crop farming areas near Cookhouse, it still maintains a wide geographical range and the overall population has not yet declined significantly.

The species receives protection in several protected areas including Addo Elephant National Park, Baviaanskloof Nature Reserve, Mpofu Nature Reserve, Tsolwana Nature Reserve, and Swartberg Nature Reserve.
