= Allothele malawi =

Conservation status
- Least Concern (IUCN 3.1)

Scientific classification
- Kingdom: Animalia
- Phylum: Arthropoda
- Subphylum: Chelicerata
- Class: Arachnida
- Order: Araneae
- Infraorder: Mygalomorphae
- Family: Euagridae
- Genus: Allothele
- Species: A. malawi

Binomial name
- Allothele malawi Coyle, 1984

Synonyms
- Euagrus caffer Raven, 1983

Species of trapdoor spider

Allothele malawi, commonly known as the Malawi sheet-web spider, is a species of mygalomorph spider in the family Euagridae (formerly Dipluridae). It is found in Malawi and South Africa.

== Etymology ==
The specific name is a noun in apposition taken from the type locality of Malawi.

== Distribution ==
Allothele malawi has been recorded from two widely separated localities in southeastern Africa. The species was originally described from specimens collected in Malawi on Mount Mulanje at the Lichenya Plateau. In South Africa, it occurs in three provinces: Gauteng, Limpopo, and Mpumalanga, with populations found in protected areas including Blouberg Nature Reserve and Kruger National Park.

The species is found at elevations ranging from 520 to 1,519 meters above sea level.

== Habitat ==
Allothele malawi inhabits a variety of environments, from dense forest to grassland. In Malawi, specimens were collected in pitfall traps placed in habitats ranging from forest to wet grassland with seeping water to very dry grassland. The species has been found in areas with diverse vegetation including under the rough bark of living Widdringtonia trees, in leaf rosettes of Helichrysum, and in leaf litter.

In South Africa, the species has been sampled from Grassland and Savanna biomes and constructs sheet webs with funnel retreats.

== Description ==
Males of A. malawi most closely resemble those of Allothele regnardi but can be distinguished by several morphological features. They possess a spine on the metatarsal II apophysis and have a shorter, more truncate tibia II apophysis.

The carapace is tan to medium brown in coloration, while the abdominal dorsum is light purple to dark purple-brown. Males have a moderately wide palpal bulb with an embolus tapering gradually to the tip.

Females differ from most other Allothele species by their relatively straight spermathecal trunks with bases that are not especially wide and by the relatively short, broadly constricted pair of bulbs at the end of each trunk. The lateral spermathecal bulbs are proportionally smaller and their stalks absent or less strongly constructed than those of the closely related A. regnardi.

== Conservation status ==
Allothele malawi is classified as Least Concern due to its wide geographical range across two countries. In South Africa, populations are protected in several reserves including Blouberg Nature Reserve, Kruger National Park, and New Agatha Forest. There are no significant known threats to the species, and no specific conservation actions are currently recommended.
