= Euagrus atropurpureus =

Conservation status
- Data Deficient (IUCN 3.1)

Scientific classification
- Kingdom: Animalia
- Phylum: Arthropoda
- Subphylum: Chelicerata
- Class: Arachnida
- Order: Araneae
- Infraorder: Mygalomorphae
- Family: Euagridae
- Genus: Euagrus
- Species: E. atropurpureus

Binomial name
- Euagrus atropurpureus Purcell, 1903

Species of spider

Euagrus atropurpureus is a species of spider of the genus Euagrus in the family Euagridae. It is endemic to South Africa. The species is known by the common name Prince Albert's sheet-web spider.

Only the female of Euagrus atropurpureus has been described, and male specimens remain unknown.

== Etymology ==
The species name "atropurpureus" derives from Latin, meaning "dark purple", referring to the coloration of the specimen.

== Distribution ==
Euagrus atropurpureus is endemic to the Western Cape Province of South Africa, specifically recorded from Prince Albert. The species has a very restricted distribution at an elevation of 614 metres above sea level.

== Habitat ==
The species has been sampled from the Nama Karoo biome.

== Conservation status ==
Euagrus atropurpureus is listed as Data Deficient due to taxonomic uncertainty. The conservation status reflects the need for additional sampling to collect male specimens and better determine the species' range.

== Taxonomy ==
The species was first described by W. F. Purcell in 1903 from specimens collected at Prince Albert. However, the taxonomic status of E. atropurpureus has been questioned. Coyle (1984) noted that this species is misplaced and belongs neither to Euagrus nor to Allothele. The holotype is a female specimen (probably not adult) that was deposited at the Iziko South African Museum in Cape Town, but is presumed lost.

The genus Euagrus was transferred from the family Dipluridae to Euagridae by Opatova et al. in 2020.
