= A. magna =

A. magna may refer to:

An abbreviation of a species name. In binomial nomenclature the name of a species is always the name of the genus to which the species belongs, followed by the species name (also called the species epithet). In A. magna the genus name has been abbreviated to A. and the species has been spelled out in full. In a document that uses this abbreviation it should always be clear from the context which genus name has been abbreviated.

- Alberta magna, the Natal flame bush, a plant species endemic to South Africa
- Arachnothera magna, the streaked spiderhunter, a bird species found in Bangladesh, Bhutan, Cambodia, China, India, Laos, Malaysia, Myanmar, Nepal, Thailand and Vietnam
- Australothele magna, species of mygalomorph spider endemic to Australia
- Austroplebeia magna, a stingless bee species endemic to Australia

== See also ==
- Magna (disambiguation)
