= Namirea planipes =

Scientific classification
- Kingdom: Animalia
- Phylum: Arthropoda
- Subphylum: Chelicerata
- Class: Arachnida
- Order: Araneae
- Infraorder: Mygalomorphae
- Family: Euagridae
- Genus: Namirea
- Species: N. planipes

Binomial name
- Namirea planipes Raven, 1984

Species of spider

Namirea planipes is a species of mygalomorph spider in the Euagridae family. It is endemic to Australia. It was described in 1984 by Australian arachnologist Robert Raven.

== Distribution and habitat ==
The species occurs in south-eastern Queensland, including the McPherson and adjacent ranges, in open and closed forest habitats. The type locality is Rochedale State Forest, south of Brisbane.

== Behaviour ==
The spiders are fossorial, terrestrial predators. They construct curtain webs over crevices in rotting logs and in the ground.
