= Leptothele chang =

Scientific classification
- Domain: Eukaryota
- Kingdom: Animalia
- Phylum: Arthropoda
- Subphylum: Chelicerata
- Class: Arachnida
- Order: Araneae
- Infraorder: Mygalomorphae
- Family: Euagridae
- Genus: Leptothele
- Species: L. chang

Binomial name
- Leptothele chang Schwendinger, 2020

Genus of spiders

Leptothele chang is a species of spider in the family Euagridae native to Thailand.
