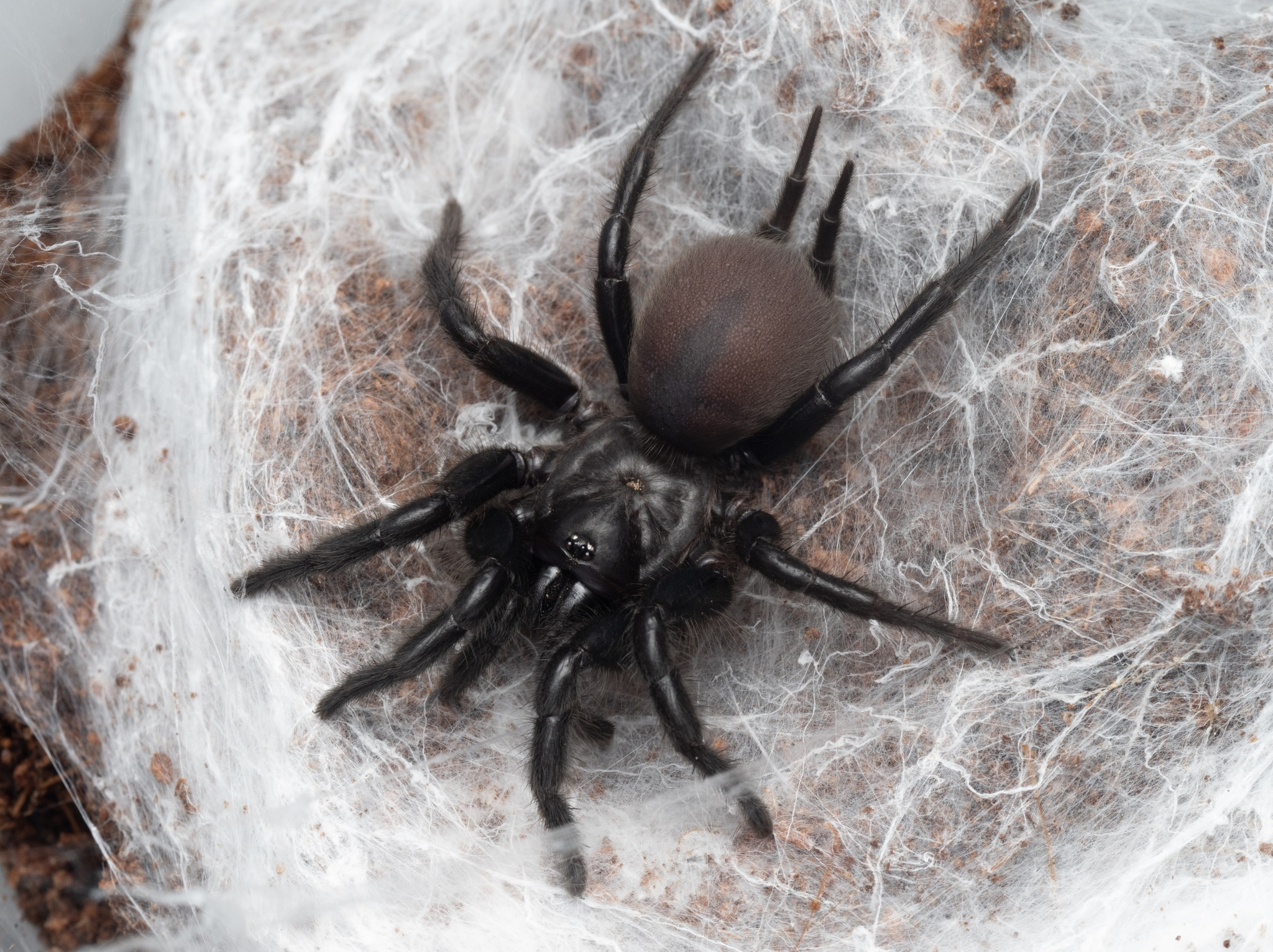

Scientific classification
- Kingdom: Animalia
- Phylum: Arthropoda
- Subphylum: Chelicerata
- Class: Arachnida
- Order: Araneae
- Infraorder: Mygalomorphae
- Family: Euagridae
- Genus: Cethegus
- Species: C. robustus

Binomial name
- Cethegus robustus Raven, 1984

= Cethegus robustus =

Species of spider

Cethegus robustus is a species of mygalomorph spider in the family Euagridae. It is endemic to Australia. It was first described in 1984 by Australian arachnologist Robert Raven.

== Distribution and habitat ==
The species occurs in Far North Queensland in open forest habitats. The type locality is Chillagoe.

== Behaviour ==
The spiders are fossorial, terrestrial predators. They construct curtain-like silk webs over their burrows.
