= Allothele regnardi =

Scientific classification
- Kingdom: Animalia
- Phylum: Arthropoda
- Subphylum: Chelicerata
- Class: Arachnida
- Order: Araneae
- Infraorder: Mygalomorphae
- Family: Euagridae
- Genus: Allothele
- Species: A. regnardi

Binomial name
- Allothele regnardi (Benoit, 1964)

Synonyms
- Evagrus regnardi Benoit, 1964; Euagrus regnardi Benoit, 1964

Species of spider

Allothele regnardi is a species of mygalomorph spider in the family Dipluridae. It is found in central and southern Africa.

The species name regnardi honors A. Regnard, who collected specimens in the Democratic Republic of the Congo.

== Taxonomy ==
The species was originally described by Pierre Benoit in 1964 as Evagrus regnardi, later transferred to Euagrus, and finally moved to its current genus Allothele by Frederick Coyle in 1984.

== Distribution ==
Allothele regnardi has been recorded from southern Zaire (now the Democratic Republic of the Congo) and possibly extending westward to western Angola. Specimens have been collected from Lualaba Province in the Democratic Republic of the Congo, specifically from Dilolo in the Kisenge area, and from Katanga Province.

== Description ==
Allothele regnardi is a medium-sized mygalomorph spider that can be distinguished from its close relatives by several morphological characteristics.

=== Females ===
The females have a light brown to chestnut-brown carapace and a medium brown to purple-gray-brown abdominal opisthosoma. The spermathecal structure is distinctive, with moderately broad trunks at the base that are fairly straight. Each trunk terminates in a pair of weakly sclerotized bulbs, with the lateral bulb being larger and evenly rounded, attached by a distinct stalk connecting to the dorsolateral surface of the base of the median bulb. Females have fewer cheliceral denticles compared to related species, with counts of 17–20 denticles.

=== Males ===
Males are unique among Allothele species in lacking a spine on the metatarsus II apophysis. The palpus is relatively long and tapers gradually to the embolus tip in retrolateral view. The tibia II apophysis is relatively stout but apically drawn out or pointed in lateral view, positioned on the ventral aspect of the prolateral surface of the tibia. The carapace is light brown, and the abdominal dorsum ranges from light purple-brown to dark purple-brown.
