= Leptothele bencha =

Scientific classification
- Domain: Eukaryota
- Kingdom: Animalia
- Phylum: Arthropoda
- Subphylum: Chelicerata
- Class: Arachnida
- Order: Araneae
- Infraorder: Mygalomorphae
- Family: Euagridae
- Genus: Leptothele; Raven & Schwendinger, 1995
- Species: L. bencha

Binomial name
- Leptothele bencha Raven & Schwendinger, 1995

Genus of spiders

Leptothele bencha is a species of spiders in the family Euagridae first described by Robert Raven & Peter J. Schwendinger in 1995, and is native to the Malay Peninsula.
