= Caledothele australiensis =

Scientific classification
- Kingdom: Animalia
- Phylum: Arthropoda
- Subphylum: Chelicerata
- Class: Arachnida
- Order: Araneae
- Infraorder: Mygalomorphae
- Family: Euagridae
- Genus: Caledothele
- Species: C. australiensis

Binomial name
- Caledothele australiensis (Raven, 1984)

Synonyms
- Stenygrocercus australiensis Raven, 1984

Species of spider

Caledothele australiensis is a species of mygalomorph spider in the Euagridae family. It is endemic to Australia. It was described in 1984 by Australian arachnologist Robert Raven.

== Distribution and habitat ==
The species occurs in Gippsland, Victoria, in tall open forest and moist sclerophyll fern forest habitats. The type locality is the Cann River Valley Forest.

== Behaviour ==
The spiders are terrestrial predators which construct flimsy tubular silk shelters under logs and bark.
