= Namirea johnlyonsi =

Scientific classification
- Kingdom: Animalia
- Phylum: Arthropoda
- Subphylum: Chelicerata
- Class: Arachnida
- Order: Araneae
- Infraorder: Mygalomorphae
- Family: Euagridae
- Genus: Namirea
- Species: N. johnlyonsi

Binomial name
- Namirea johnlyonsi Raven, 1993

Species of spider

Namirea johnlyonsi is a species of mygalomorph spider in the Euagridae family. It is endemic to Australia. It was described in 1993 by Australian arachnologist Robert Raven. The specific epithet johnlyonsi honours John Lyons of the Museum of Tropical Queensland.

== Distribution and habitat ==
The species occurs in North Queensland. The type locality is an embankment in a mixed forest ecotone, including eucalypts, Casuarina and rainforest, in the Mount Spec National Park north of Townsville.
