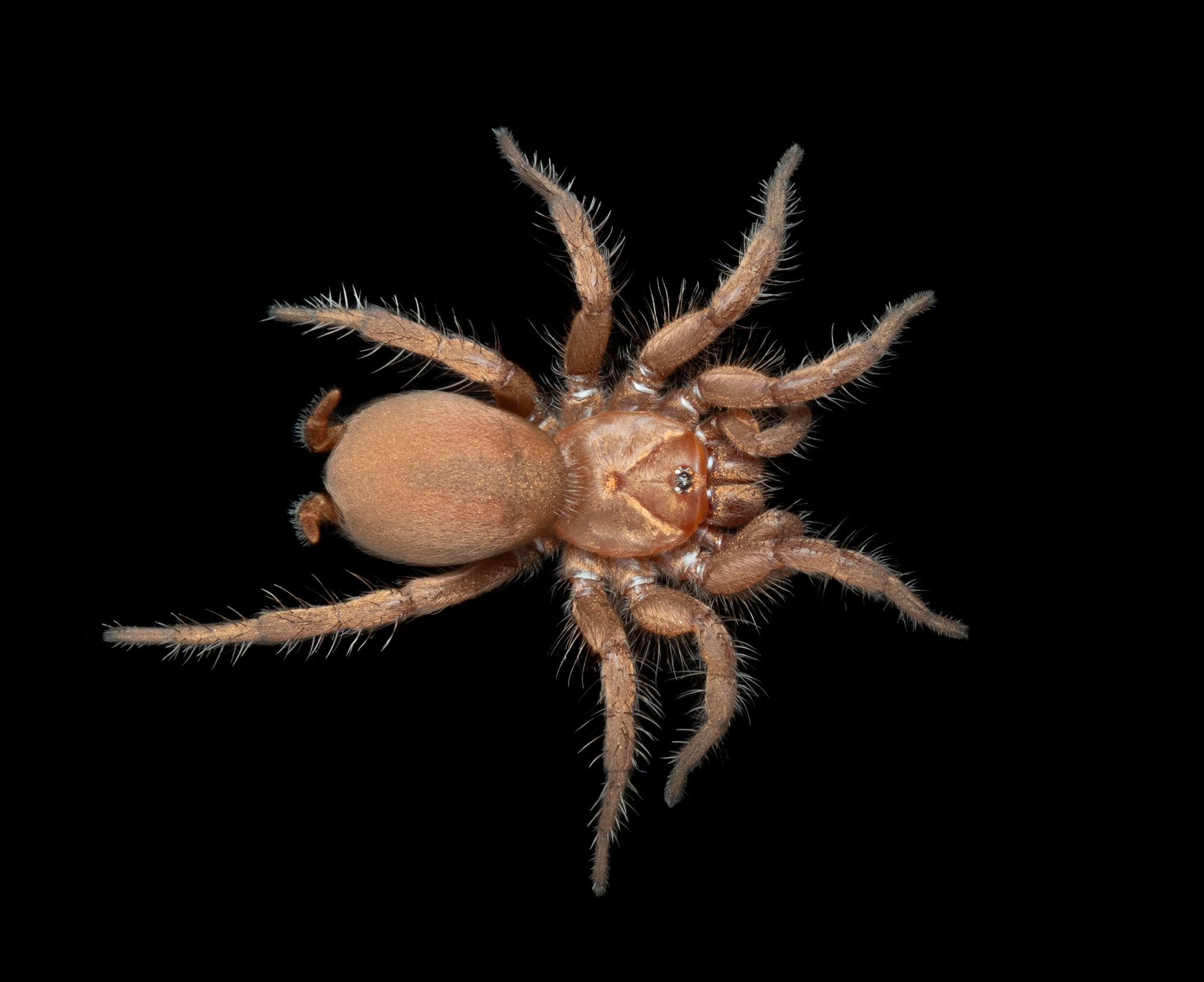

Scientific classification
- Kingdom: Animalia
- Phylum: Arthropoda
- Subphylum: Chelicerata
- Class: Arachnida
- Order: Araneae
- Infraorder: Mygalomorphae
- Family: Euagridae
- Genus: Cethegus
- Species: C. ischnotheloides

Binomial name
- Cethegus ischnotheloides Raven, 1985

= Cethegus ischnotheloides =

Species of spider

Cethegus ischnotheloides is a species of mygalomorph spider in the family Euagridae. It is endemic to Australia. It was first described in 1985 by Australian arachnologist Robert Raven.

== Distribution and habitat ==
The species occurs in inland South Australia. The type locality is Commonwealth Hill Station.
