= Australothele montana =

Scientific classification
- Kingdom: Animalia
- Phylum: Arthropoda
- Subphylum: Chelicerata
- Class: Arachnida
- Order: Araneae
- Infraorder: Mygalomorphae
- Family: Euagridae
- Genus: Australothele
- Species: A. montana

Binomial name
- Australothele montana Raven, 1984

Species of spider

Australothele montana is a species of mygalomorph spider in the Euagridae family. It is endemic to Australia. It was described in 1984 by Australian arachnologist Robert Raven.

== Distribution and habitat ==
The species occurs in northeastern New South Wales. The type locality is a closed forest in the New England National Park.

== Behaviour ==
The spiders are fossorial, terrestrial predators. They construct burrows lined with silk tubes beneath logs and rocks.
