= Cethegus broomi =

Scientific classification
- Kingdom: Animalia
- Phylum: Arthropoda
- Subphylum: Chelicerata
- Class: Arachnida
- Order: Araneae
- Infraorder: Mygalomorphae
- Family: Euagridae
- Genus: Cethegus
- Species: C. broomi

Binomial name
- Cethegus broomi (Hogg, 1901)

Synonyms
- Stenygrocercus broomi Hogg, 1901

Species of spider

Cethegus broomi is a species of mygalomorph spider in the Euagridae family. It is endemic to Australia. It was described in 1901 by British arachnologist Henry Roughton Hogg.

== Distribution and habitat ==
The species occurs on the Northern Tablelands of New South Wales in open forest habitats. The type locality is Hillgrove, about 30 km east of Armidale.

== Behaviour ==
The spiders are fossorial, terrestrial predators. They construct silk webs.
