= Caledothele elegans =

Scientific classification
- Domain: Eukaryota
- Kingdom: Animalia
- Phylum: Arthropoda
- Subphylum: Chelicerata
- Class: Arachnida
- Order: Araneae
- Infraorder: Mygalomorphae
- Family: Euagridae
- Genus: Caledothele
- Species: C. elegans

Binomial name
- Caledothele elegans Raven, 1991

Species of spider

Caledothele elegans is a spider species in the genus Caledothele found in New Caledonia.
