= Cethegus lugubris =

Scientific classification
- Kingdom: Animalia
- Phylum: Arthropoda
- Subphylum: Chelicerata
- Class: Arachnida
- Order: Araneae
- Infraorder: Mygalomorphae
- Family: Euagridae
- Genus: Cethegus
- Species: C. lugubris

Binomial name
- Cethegus lugubris Thorell, 1881

Species of spider

Cethegus lugubris is a species of mygalomorph spider in the Euagridae family. It is endemic to Australia. It was described in 1881 by Swedish arachnologist Tamerlan Thorell.

== Distribution and habitat ==
The species occurs in Far North Queensland in closed and open forest habitats. The type locality is Somerset at the northernmost tip of the Cape York Peninsula.

== Behaviour ==
The spiders are fossorial, terrestrial predators. They construct tubular silk webs.
