= Cethegus hanni =

Scientific classification
- Kingdom: Animalia
- Phylum: Arthropoda
- Subphylum: Chelicerata
- Class: Arachnida
- Order: Araneae
- Infraorder: Mygalomorphae
- Family: Euagridae
- Genus: Cethegus
- Species: C. hanni

Binomial name
- Cethegus hanni Raven, 1984

Species of spider

Cethegus hanni is a species of mygalomorph spider in the Euagridae family. It is endemic to Australia. It was described in 1984 by Australian arachnologist Robert Raven. The specific epithet refers to the type locality.

== Distribution and habitat ==
The species occurs in Far North Queensland in open forest habitats on the Cape York Peninsula. The type locality is near the Hann River.

== Behaviour ==
The spiders are fossorial, terrestrial predators. They construct funnel-like silk webs and burrows.
