= Cethegus elegans =

Scientific classification
- Kingdom: Animalia
- Phylum: Arthropoda
- Subphylum: Chelicerata
- Class: Arachnida
- Order: Araneae
- Infraorder: Mygalomorphae
- Family: Euagridae
- Genus: Cethegus
- Species: C. elegans

Binomial name
- Cethegus elegans Raven, 1984

Species of spider

Cethegus elegans is a species of spider in the genus Cethegus found in Queensland.
