= Australothele jamiesoni =

Scientific classification
- Kingdom: Animalia
- Phylum: Arthropoda
- Subphylum: Chelicerata
- Class: Arachnida
- Order: Araneae
- Infraorder: Mygalomorphae
- Family: Euagridae
- Genus: Australothele
- Species: A. jamiesoni

Binomial name
- Australothele jamiesoni Raven, 1984

Species of spider

Australothele jamiesoni is a species of mygalomorph spider in the Euagridae family. It is endemic to Australia. It was described in 1984 by Australian arachnologist Robert Raven.

== Distribution and habitat ==
The species occurs in south-eastern Queensland and the border ranges of north-eastern New South Wales in closed forest habitats. The type locality is Little Yabba Creek in the Conondale Range.

== Behaviour ==
The spiders are arboreal and terrestrial predators which construct tubular silk shelters beneath rocks and logs and on tree trunks in creviced bark.
