= Namirea eungella =

Scientific classification
- Kingdom: Animalia
- Phylum: Arthropoda
- Subphylum: Chelicerata
- Class: Arachnida
- Order: Araneae
- Infraorder: Mygalomorphae
- Family: Euagridae
- Genus: Namirea
- Species: N. eungella

Binomial name
- Namirea eungella Raven, 1984

Species of spider

Namirea eungella is a species of mygalomorph spider in the Euagridae family. It is endemic to Australia. It was described in 1984 by Australian arachnologist Robert Raven. The specific epithet eungella refers to the species’ distribution.

== Distribution and habitat ==
The species occurs in the Mackay Region of North Queensland, including Finch Hatton and the Eungella National Park, in open forest as well as rainforest and coastal vine thicket habitats. The type locality is Homevale, some 820 km north-west of Brisbane.

== Behaviour ==
The spiders are fossorial, terrestrial predators that build curtain webs over their burrows.
