= Cethegus pallipes =

Scientific classification
- Kingdom: Animalia
- Phylum: Arthropoda
- Subphylum: Chelicerata
- Class: Arachnida
- Order: Araneae
- Infraorder: Mygalomorphae
- Family: Euagridae
- Genus: Cethegus
- Species: C. pallipes

Binomial name
- Cethegus pallipes Raven, 1984

Species of spider

Cethegus pallipes is a species of mygalomorph spider in the Euagridae family. It is endemic to Australia. It was described in 1984 by Australian arachnologist Robert Raven.

== Distribution and habitat ==
The species occurs in Far North Queensland in closed forest habitats on the Cape York Peninsula. The type locality is Mount Cook, Cooktown.

== Behaviour ==
The spiders are fossorial, terrestrial predators. They construct curtain-like silk webs beneath rocks, in tree buttresses and under bark.
