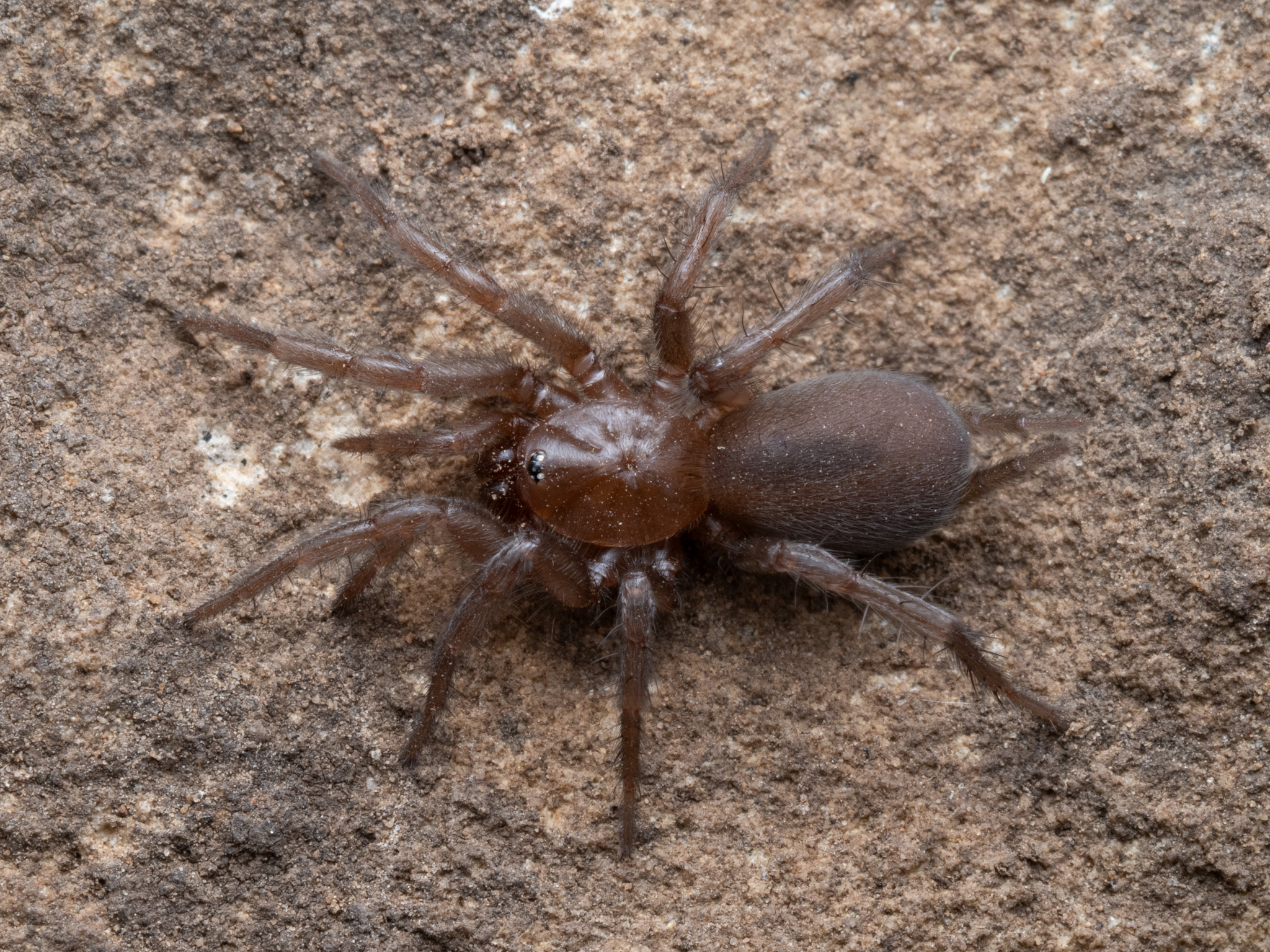

Scientific classification
- Kingdom: Animalia
- Phylum: Arthropoda
- Subphylum: Chelicerata
- Class: Arachnida
- Order: Araneae
- Infraorder: Mygalomorphae
- Family: Euagridae
- Genus: Euagrus
- Species: E. chisoseus

Binomial name
- Euagrus chisoseus Gertsch, 1939

= Euagrus chisoseus =

Species of spider

Euagrus chisoseus, the spiny curtain web spider, is a species of mygalomorph spider in the family Euagridae. It is found in the United States and Mexico.
