= Cethegus daemeli =

Scientific classification
- Kingdom: Animalia
- Phylum: Arthropoda
- Subphylum: Chelicerata
- Class: Arachnida
- Order: Araneae
- Infraorder: Mygalomorphae
- Family: Euagridae
- Genus: Cethegus
- Species: C. daemeli

Binomial name
- Cethegus daemeli Raven, 1984

Species of spider

Cethegus daemeli is a species of mygalomorph spider in the Euagridae family. It is endemic to Australia. It was described in 1984 by Australian arachnologist Robert Raven.

== Distribution and habitat ==
The species occurs in Far North Queensland in closed forest habitats in the Iron Range area. The type locality is Line Hill, near the Lockhart River Mission.

== Behaviour ==
The spiders are fossorial, terrestrial and arboreal predators. They construct curtain-like silk webs with tubular burrows as shelters beneath logs, in tree buttresses and under bark.
