= Euagrus formosanus =

Scientific classification
- Domain: Eukaryota
- Kingdom: Animalia
- Phylum: Arthropoda
- Subphylum: Chelicerata
- Class: Arachnida
- Order: Araneae
- Infraorder: Mygalomorphae
- Family: Euagridae
- Genus: Euagrus
- Species: E. formosanus

Binomial name
- Euagrus formosanus Saito, 1933

Species of spider

Euagrus formosanus is a species of Taiwanese spider in the family Euagridae. It was first described in 1933 from a female specimen found in the Taihoku Prefecture of Taiwan. Its Japanese name is "Taiwan-Jegogume".

== Physical characteristics ==
Adult females have a light grey hairless thorax about 1.2 centimeters long with three pairs of circular furrows. Its eyes are relatively small and all eight are white, the central four forming a trapezoid. The legs are about 1.5 centimeters long, and are a paler grey than the thorax with long black hairs. The sternum is square shaped, extending from the head to the fourth pair of legs. The abdomen is oval shaped and also grey, coated in black hairs. It has four spinnerets, the rear pair longer than the front pair at .7 centimeters.

It is similar in size and color to Euagrus mexicanus, but there are two main differences. The first is a square shaped sternum rather than the oval one found in E. mexicanus. The second is that the labium only contacts the sternum, rather than inserting into it as it does in E. mexicanus.
