= Australothele nambucca =

Scientific classification
- Kingdom: Animalia
- Phylum: Arthropoda
- Subphylum: Chelicerata
- Class: Arachnida
- Order: Araneae
- Infraorder: Mygalomorphae
- Family: Euagridae
- Genus: Australothele
- Species: A. nambucca

Binomial name
- Australothele nambucca Raven, 1984

Species of spider

Australothele nambucca is a species of mygalomorph spider in the Euagridae family. It is endemic to Australia. It was described in 1984 by Australian arachnologist Robert Raven.

== Distribution and habitat ==
The species occurs in north-eastern New South Wales in closed forest. The type locality is Sawtell.

== Behaviour ==
The spiders are terrestrial predators.
