= Namirea dougwallacei =

Scientific classification
- Kingdom: Animalia
- Phylum: Arthropoda
- Subphylum: Chelicerata
- Class: Arachnida
- Order: Araneae
- Infraorder: Mygalomorphae
- Family: Euagridae
- Genus: Namirea
- Species: N. dougwallacei

Binomial name
- Namirea dougwallacei Raven, 1993

Species of spider

Namirea dougwallacei is a species of mygalomorph spider in the Euagridae family. It is endemic to Australia. It was described in 1993 by Australian arachnologist Robert Raven. The specific epithet dougwallacei honours Rockhampton arachnologist Doug Wallace, who was instrumental in obtaining type specimens.

== Distribution and habitat ==
The species occurs in Central Queensland. The type locality is vine thicket habitat on the summit of Mount Archer, Rockhampton.
