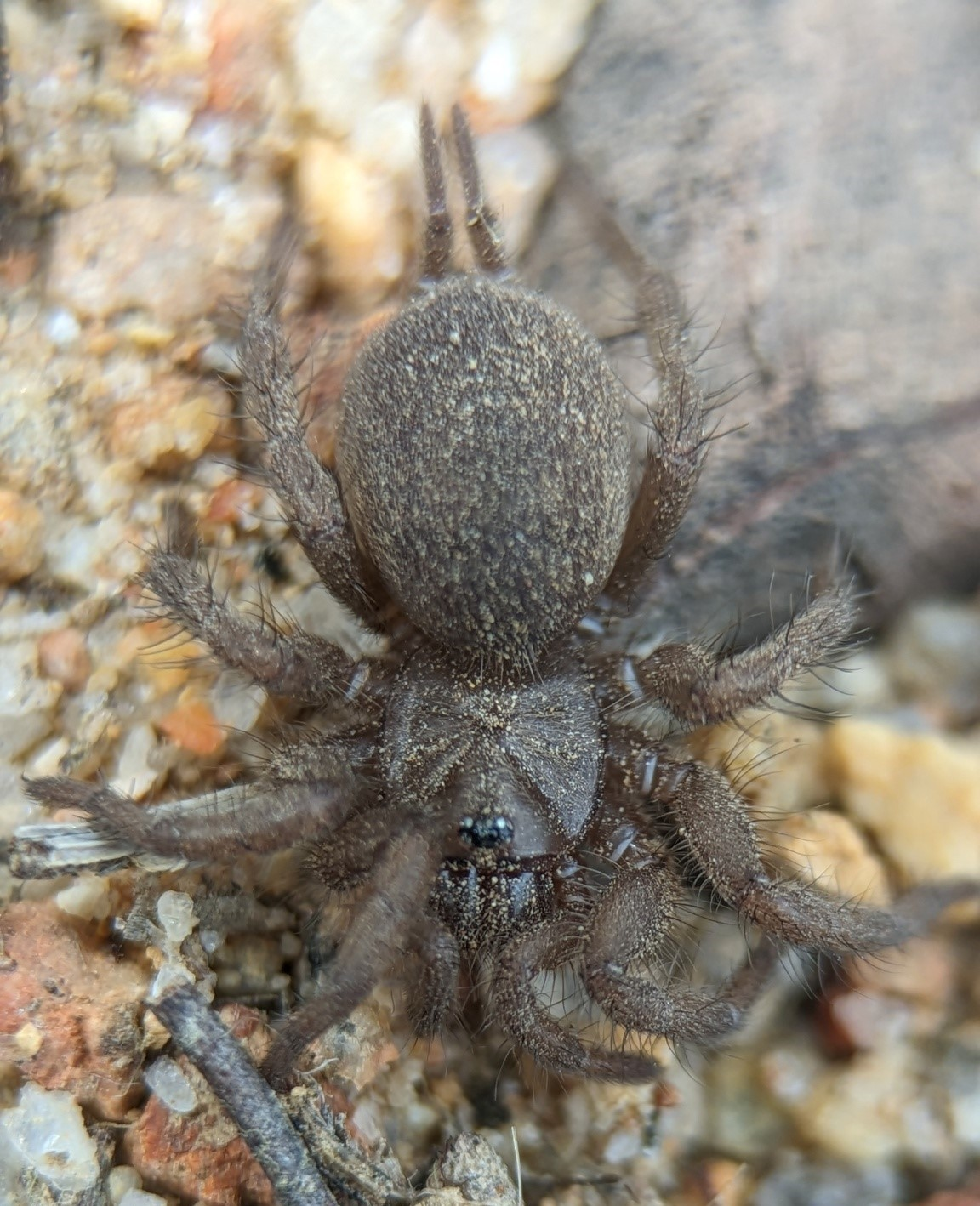

Scientific classification
- Kingdom: Animalia
- Phylum: Arthropoda
- Subphylum: Chelicerata
- Class: Arachnida
- Order: Araneae
- Infraorder: Mygalomorphae
- Family: Euagridae
- Genus: Cethegus
- Species: C. fugax

Binomial name
- Cethegus fugax (Simon, 1908)

Synonyms
- Palaevagrus fugax Simon, 1908

= Cethegus fugax =

Species of spider

Cethegus fugax is a species of mygalomorph spider in the family Euagridae . It is endemic to Australia. It was first described in 1908 by French arachnologist Eugène Simon.

== Distribution and habitat ==
The species occurs in South Australia and Western Australia, in low woodland and open forest habitats, on sandy and gravelly soils. The type locality is Lion Mill (now Mount Helena, a suburb of Perth).

== Behaviour ==
The spiders are fossorial, terrestrial predators. They construct sheet webs against rocks, logs and stumps.
