= Cethegus barraba =

Scientific classification
- Kingdom: Animalia
- Phylum: Arthropoda
- Subphylum: Chelicerata
- Class: Arachnida
- Order: Araneae
- Infraorder: Mygalomorphae
- Family: Euagridae
- Genus: Cethegus
- Species: C. barraba

Binomial name
- Cethegus barraba Raven, 1984

Species of spider

Cethegus barraba is a species of mygalomorph spider in the Euagridae family. It is endemic to Australia. It was described in 1984 by Australian arachnologist Robert Raven. The specific epithet barraba refers to the type locality.

== Distribution and habitat ==
The species occurs in north-eastern New South Wales in open forest habitats. The type locality is Barraba. It has also been recorded from Mount Kaputar National Park.

== Behaviour ==
The spiders are terrestrial predators which construct tubular silk shelters.
