= Namirea montislewisi =

Scientific classification
- Kingdom: Animalia
- Phylum: Arthropoda
- Subphylum: Chelicerata
- Class: Arachnida
- Order: Araneae
- Infraorder: Mygalomorphae
- Family: Euagridae
- Genus: Namirea
- Species: N. montislewisi

Binomial name
- Namirea montislewisi Raven, 1984

Species of spider

Namirea montislewisi is a species of mygalomorph spider in the Euagridae family. It is endemic to Australia. It was described in 1984 by Australian arachnologist Robert Raven. The specific epithet montislewisi refers to the type locality.

== Distribution and habitat ==
The species occurs in Far North Queensland, including the environs of Cairns, in closed forest habitats. The type locality is Mount Lewis.

== Behaviour ==
The spiders are fossorial, terrestrial predators. They construct tubular webs beneath rocks and logs and in the ground.
