= Namirea insularis =

Scientific classification
- Kingdom: Animalia
- Phylum: Arthropoda
- Subphylum: Chelicerata
- Class: Arachnida
- Order: Araneae
- Infraorder: Mygalomorphae
- Family: Euagridae
- Genus: Namirea
- Species: N. insularis

Binomial name
- Namirea insularis Raven, 1984

Species of spider

Namirea insularis is a species of mygalomorph spider in the Euagridae family. It is endemic to Australia. It was described in 1984 by Australian arachnologist Robert Raven.

== Distribution and habitat ==
The species occurs in south-east Queensland in closed forest habitats. The type locality is Burleigh Heads.

== Behaviour ==
The spiders are fossorial, terrestrial predators.
