= Cethegus colemani =

Scientific classification
- Kingdom: Animalia
- Phylum: Arthropoda
- Subphylum: Chelicerata
- Class: Arachnida
- Order: Araneae
- Infraorder: Mygalomorphae
- Family: Euagridae
- Genus: Cethegus
- Species: C. colemani

Binomial name
- Cethegus colemani Raven, 1984

Species of spider

Cethegus colemani is a species of mygalomorph spider in the Euagridae family. It is endemic to Australia. It was described in 1984 by Australian arachnologist Robert Raven.

== Distribution and habitat ==
The species occurs in north-eastern Queensland in closed forest habitats. The type locality is Mareeba. It has also been recorded from Cairns.

== Behaviour ==
The spiders are terrestrial predators which construct silk shelters.
