= Chinothele =

Scientific classification
- Kingdom: Animalia
- Phylum: Arthropoda
- Subphylum: Chelicerata
- Class: Arachnida
- Order: Araneae
- Infraorder: Mygalomorphae
- Family: Euagridae
- Genus: Chinothele; Yu, S. Y. Zhang & F. Zhang, 2021
- Species: C. jixiang

Binomial name
- Chinothele jixiang Yu, S. Y. Zhang & F. Zhang, 2021

Genus of spiders

Chinothele is a monotypic genus of east Asian mygalomorph spiders in the family Euagridae containing the single species, Chinothele jixiang. It was first described by K. Yu, S. Y. Zhang and F. Zhang in 2021, and it has only been found in China.
