= Caledothele =

Scientific classification
- Domain: Eukaryota
- Kingdom: Animalia
- Phylum: Arthropoda
- Subphylum: Chelicerata
- Class: Arachnida
- Order: Araneae
- Infraorder: Mygalomorphae
- Family: Euagridae
- Genus: Caledothele; Raven, 1991

Type species
- C. australiensis (Raven, 1984)

Species
- see text

Genus of spiders

Caledothele is a genus of South Pacific spiders in the family Euagridae. It was first described by Robert Raven in 1991.

== Species ==
As of May 2019 it contains seven species:

- Caledothele annulatus (Raven, 1981) – New Caledonia, Loyalty Is.
- Caledothele aoupinie Raven, 1991 – New Caledonia
- Caledothele australiensis (Raven, 1984) (type) – Australia (Victoria)
- Caledothele carina Raven, 1991 – New Caledonia
- Caledothele elegans Raven, 1991 – New Caledonia
- Caledothele tonta Raven, 1991 – New Caledonia
- Caledothele tristata Raven, 1991 – New Caledonia
