= Malayathele =

Scientific classification
- Kingdom: Animalia
- Phylum: Arthropoda
- Subphylum: Chelicerata
- Class: Arachnida
- Order: Araneae
- Infraorder: Mygalomorphae
- Family: Euagridae
- Genus: Malayathele; Schwendinger, 2020

Type species
- M. kanching Schwendinger, 2020

Species
- 4, see text

Genus of spiders

Malayathele is a genus of southeast Asian mygalomorph spiders in the family Euagridae. It was first described by Peter J. Schwendinger, C. Lehmann-Graber and K. Hongpadharakiree in 2020, and it has only been found in Malaysia.

== Species ==
As of December 2021 it contains four species:

- M. cameronensis Schwendinger, 2020 – Malaysia (Peninsula)
- M. kanching Schwendinger, 2020 (type) – Malaysia (Peninsula)
- M. maculosa Schwendinger, 2020 – Malaysia (Peninsula)
- M. ulu Schwendinger, 2020 – Malaysia (Peninsula)
