= Australothele magna =

Scientific classification
- Kingdom: Animalia
- Phylum: Arthropoda
- Subphylum: Chelicerata
- Class: Arachnida
- Order: Araneae
- Infraorder: Mygalomorphae
- Family: Euagridae
- Genus: Australothele
- Species: A. magna

Binomial name
- Australothele magna Raven, 1984

Species of spider

Australothele magna, also known as the large curtain-web spider, is a species of mygalomorph spider in the Euagridae family. It is endemic to Australia. It was described in 1984 by Australian arachnologist Robert Raven.

== Distribution and habitat ==
The species occurs in south-eastern Queensland, including the Bunya Mountains, Blackbutt and Conondale Ranges, in closed forest habitats. The type locality is Wratten's Camp, via Widgee, in the Gympie Region.

== Behaviour ==
The spiders are terrestrial predators which construct tubular silk shelters under rocks in vine thickets.
