= Phyxioschema =

Scientific classification
- Kingdom: Animalia
- Phylum: Arthropoda
- Subphylum: Chelicerata
- Class: Arachnida
- Order: Araneae
- Infraorder: Mygalomorphae
- Family: Euagridae
- Genus: Phyxioschema; Simon, 1889

Type species
- P. raddei Simon, 1889

Species
- See text.

Synonyms
- Afghanothele Roewer, 1960

Genus of spiders

Phyxioschema is a genus of Asian spiders in the family Euagridae. It was first described by Eugène Simon in 1889.

== Species ==
As of October 2025, this genus includes nine species:

- Phyxioschema erawan Schwendinger, 2009 – Thailand
- Phyxioschema eripnastes Schwendinger, 2009 – Thailand
- Phyxioschema gedrosia Schwendinger & Zamani, 2018 – Iran
- Phyxioschema huberi Schwendinger, 2009 – Thailand
- Phyxioschema raddei Simon, 1889 – Kazakhstan, Iran, Afghanistan, Uzbekistan, Turkmenistan, Tajikistan (type species)
- Phyxioschema roxana Schwendinger & Zonstein, 2011 – Uzbekistan, Tajikistan
- Phyxioschema sayamense Schwendinger, 2009 – Thailand
- Phyxioschema spelaeum Schwendinger, 2009 – Thailand
- Phyxioschema suthepium Raven & Schwendinger, 1989 – Thailand
