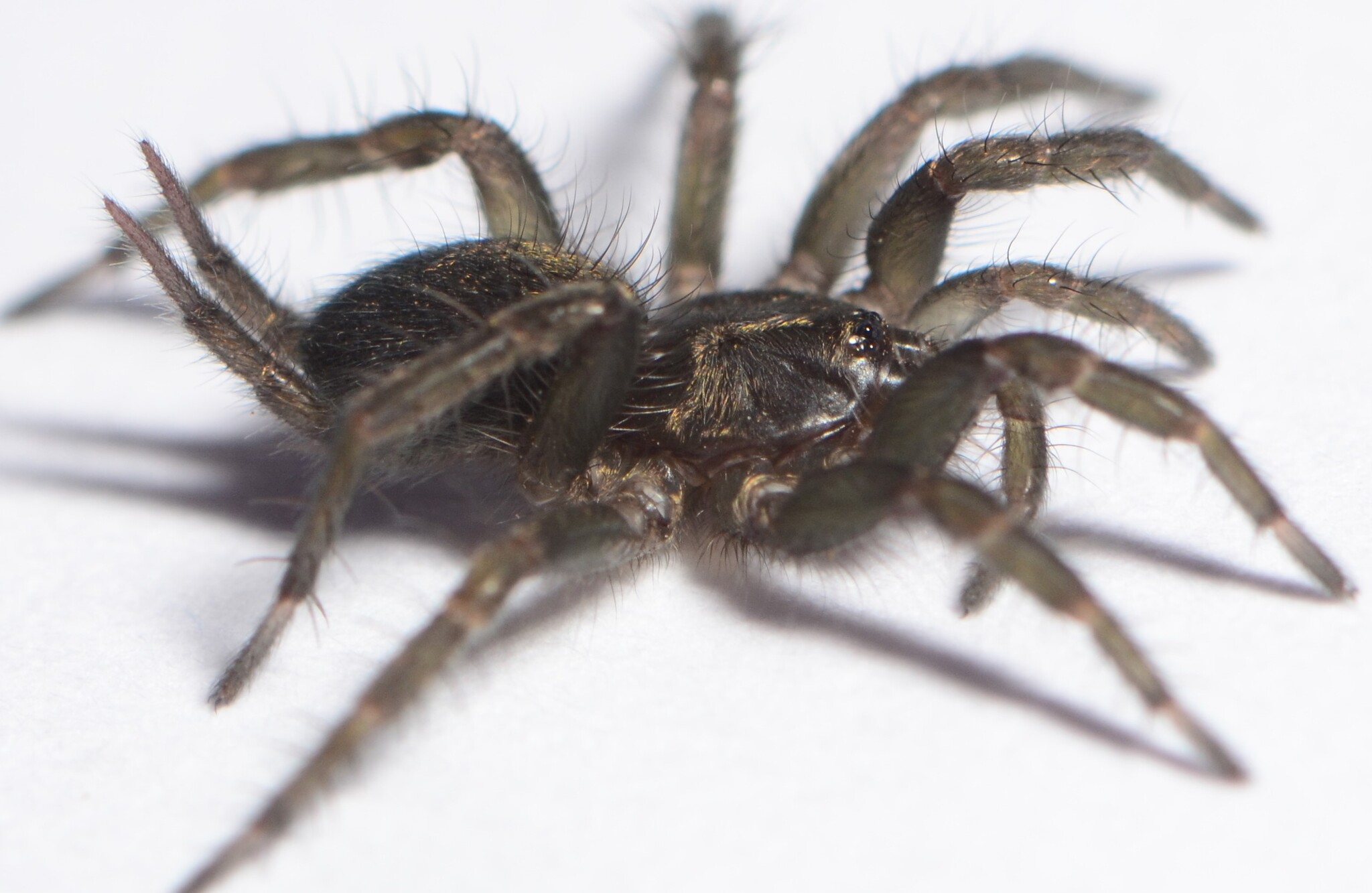
- Female
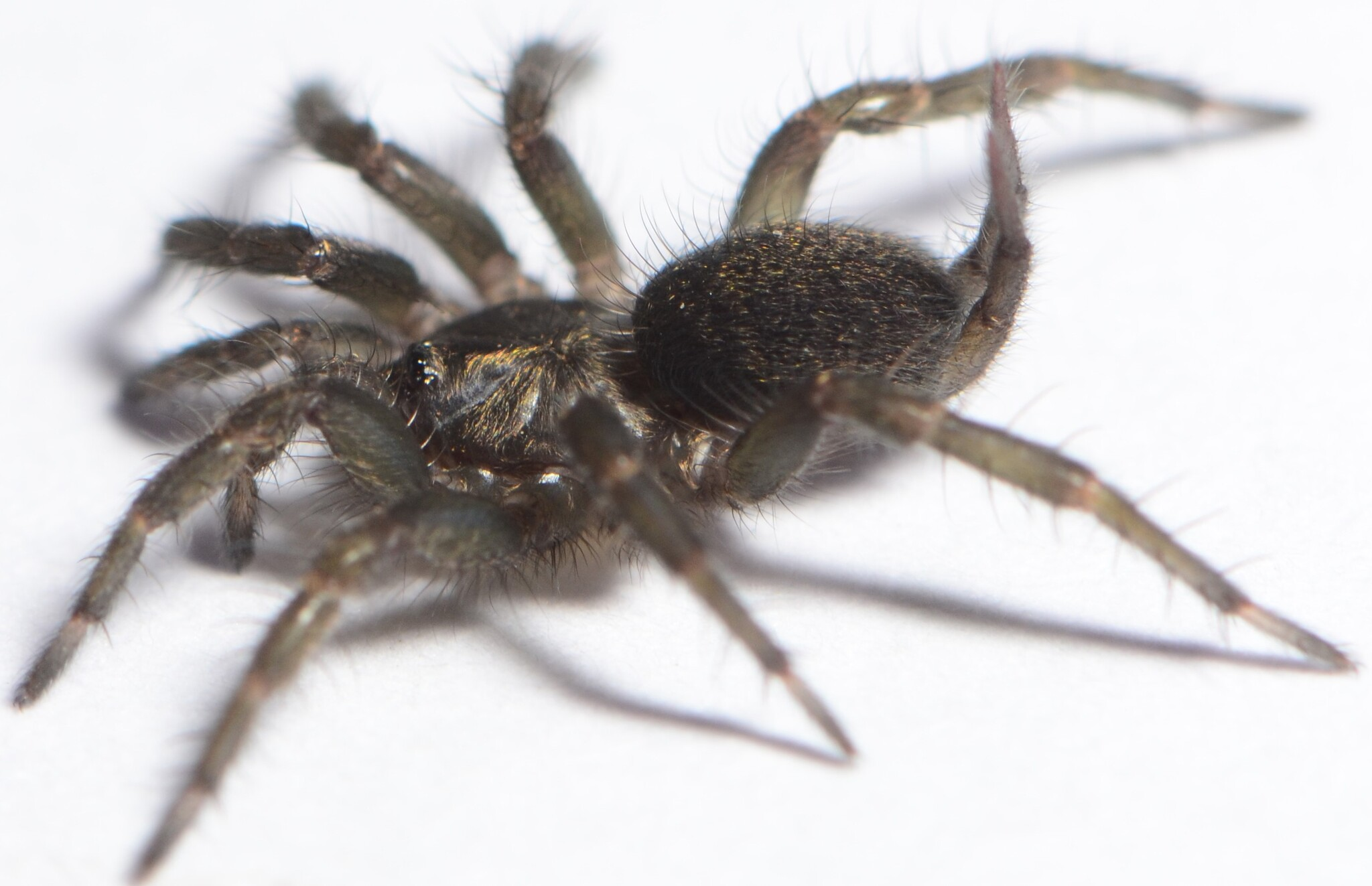
- Female

Scientific classification
- Kingdom: Animalia
- Phylum: Arthropoda
- Subphylum: Chelicerata
- Class: Arachnida
- Order: Araneae
- Infraorder: Mygalomorphae
- Family: Euagridae
- Genus: Allothele
- Species: A. teretis

Binomial name
- Allothele teretis Tucker, 1920

= Allothele teretis =

Common Allothele Sheet-Web Spider

Species of spider

Allothele teretis is a species of spider in the genus Allothele. It is found in South Africa, and was described by R. W. E. Tucker in 1920.

Its common name is Common Allothele Sheet-Web Spider.

== Description ==
The carapace of Allothele teretis is medium to dark brown with a darker border and mottling, while the abdomen is a uniform purple-black. The spinners are lighter with dark rims. The carapace length matches that of the first leg's tibia, metatarsus, and tarsus, featuring deep radiating striations.

The species' eyes are uniquely arranged: the anterior row is procurved, with small median eyes close to larger laterals, while the oval posterior median eyes touch the laterals. The chelicerae have 9 to 11 teeth, and the sternum has faint sigilla.

The legs of Allothele teretis lack scopulae but have spines, ordered 4, 3, 1, and 2. The spinners are longer than both the abdomen and carapace and have a keeled underside with white flecks.

In males, the mating apophysis on tibia II is distally slender and has two stout spines at the tip, easily distinguishing them from other Allothele species. The small number of spines on the distal half of the prolateral surface of tibia I, along with the proportionally long palpus, are also distinctive characteristics. In females, it is relatively short and stout, typically bearing three or more spines.

The female's anterior genital lip extends further posteriorly beyond the genital groove compared to other Allothele species. Except for specimens from Middledrift, Allothele teretis females feature distinctive spermathecal trunks that are strongly bent away from the midline at the distal end. The double structure of the lateral bulb observed in many specimens has not been documented in other Allothele species.

Females show significant variation in spermathecal form, with lateral bulb shapes ranging from evenly rounded to bifurcate. Middledrift specimens are distinct due to their unbent trunks and narrower bulb stalks. Despite a single male from Middledrift exhibiting a shorter palpus, it remains unclear if this population is reproductively isolated from other Allothele teretis groups.

Overall measurements include a carapace length of approximately 4.9 mm, width of 3.99 mm, abdomen length of about 5.7 mm, and spinner length of 6.5 mm. Males and females show slight differences in coloration and palpal organ structure.

== Distribution ==
The species is found in KwaZulu-Natal and the southern part of the former Transvaal province in South Africa. Its type locality is Mfongosi, near Ubombo.

== Behavior ==
Allothele teretis typically builds a sheet curtain-web in cool, shaded areas, such as on tree trunks or across holes along stream banks.
