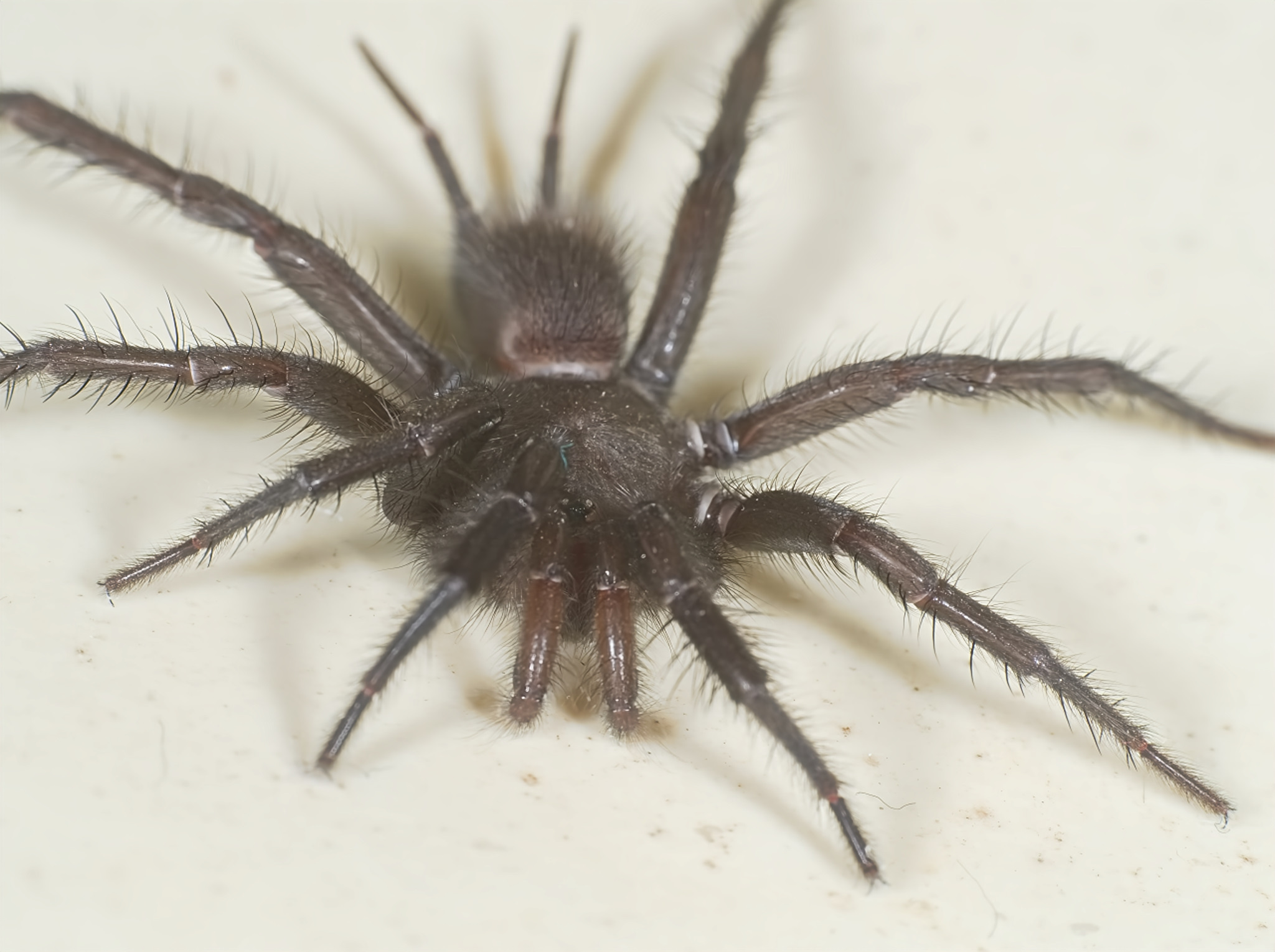

Scientific classification
- Kingdom: Animalia
- Phylum: Arthropoda
- Subphylum: Chelicerata
- Class: Arachnida
- Order: Araneae
- Infraorder: Mygalomorphae
- Family: Euagridae
- Genus: Cethegus; Thorell, 1881

Type species
- C. lugubris Thorell, 1881

Species
- See text

Synonyms
- Palaevagrus Simon, 1908

= Cethegus (spider) =

Genus of spiders

Cethegus is a genus of mygalomorph spiders in the curtain-web family Euagridae. It is endemic to Australia and was first described by Tamerlan Thorell in 1881.

== Species ==
As of July 2020 the genus contained twelve species from New South Wales (NSW), Queensland (QLD), South Australia (SA) or Western Australia (WA):

- Cethegus barraba Raven, 1984 – NSW
- Cethegus broomi (Hogg, 1901) – NSW
- Cethegus colemani Raven, 1984 – QLD
- Cethegus daemeli Raven, 1984 – QLD
- Cethegus elegans Raven, 1984 – QLD
- Cethegus fugax (Simon, 1908) – SA, WA
- Cethegus hanni Raven, 1984 – QLD
- Cethegus ischnotheloides Raven, 1985 – SA
- Cethegus lugubris Thorell, 1881 (type) – QLD
- Cethegus multispinosus Raven, 1984 – QLD
- Cethegus pallipes Raven, 1984 – QLD
- Cethegus robustus Raven, 1984 – QLD
