= Leptothele =

Scientific classification
- Domain: Eukaryota
- Kingdom: Animalia
- Phylum: Arthropoda
- Subphylum: Chelicerata
- Class: Arachnida
- Order: Araneae
- Infraorder: Mygalomorphae
- Family: Euagridae
- Genus: Leptothele; Raven & Schwendinger, 1995

Type species
- L. bencha Raven & Schwendinger, 1995

Species
- Leptothele bencha Raven & Schwendinger, 1995 — Thailand; Leptothele chang Schwendinger, 2020 — Thailand

Genus of spiders

Leptothele is a genus of Southeast Asian spiders in the family Euagridae first described by Robert Raven and Peter J. Schwendinger in 1995. It is native to the Malay Peninsula.
