= Namirea =

Scientific classification
- Domain: Eukaryota
- Kingdom: Animalia
- Phylum: Arthropoda
- Subphylum: Chelicerata
- Class: Arachnida
- Order: Araneae
- Infraorder: Mygalomorphae
- Family: Euagridae
- Genus: Namirea; Raven, 1984

Type species
- N. planipes Raven, 1984

Species
- See text.

Genus of spiders

Namirea is a genus of mygalomorph spiders in the family Euagridae. It is endemic to Australia, and was first described by Robert Raven in 1984.

== Species ==
As of July 2020 the genus contained the following species from New South Wales (NSW) and Queensland (QLD):

- Namirea dougwallacei Raven, 1993 – QLD
- Namirea eungella Raven, 1984 – QLD
- Namirea fallax Raven, 1984 – NSW
- Namirea insularis Raven, 1984 – QLD
- Namirea johnlyonsi Raven, 1993 – QLD
- Namirea montislewisi Raven, 1984 – QLD
- Namirea planipes Raven, 1984 (type) – QLD
