= Stenygrocercus =

Scientific classification
- Kingdom: Animalia
- Phylum: Arthropoda
- Subphylum: Chelicerata
- Class: Arachnida
- Order: Araneae
- Infraorder: Mygalomorphae
- Family: Euagridae
- Genus: Stenygrocercus; Simon, 1892

Type species
- S. silvicola (Simon, 1889)

Species
- See text.

Genus of spiders

Stenygrocercus is a genus of South Pacific spiders in the family Euagridae. It was first described by Eugène Simon in 1892.

== Species ==
As of July 2019 it contains the following species, all found in New Caledonia:

- Stenygrocercus alphoreus Raven, 1991 – New Caledonia
- Stenygrocercus franzi Raven, 1991 – New Caledonia
- Stenygrocercus kresta Raven, 1991 – New Caledonia
- Stenygrocercus recineus Raven, 1991 – New Caledonia
- Stenygrocercus silvicola (Simon, 1889) (type) – New Caledonia
- Stenygrocercus simoni Raven, 1991 – New Caledonia
