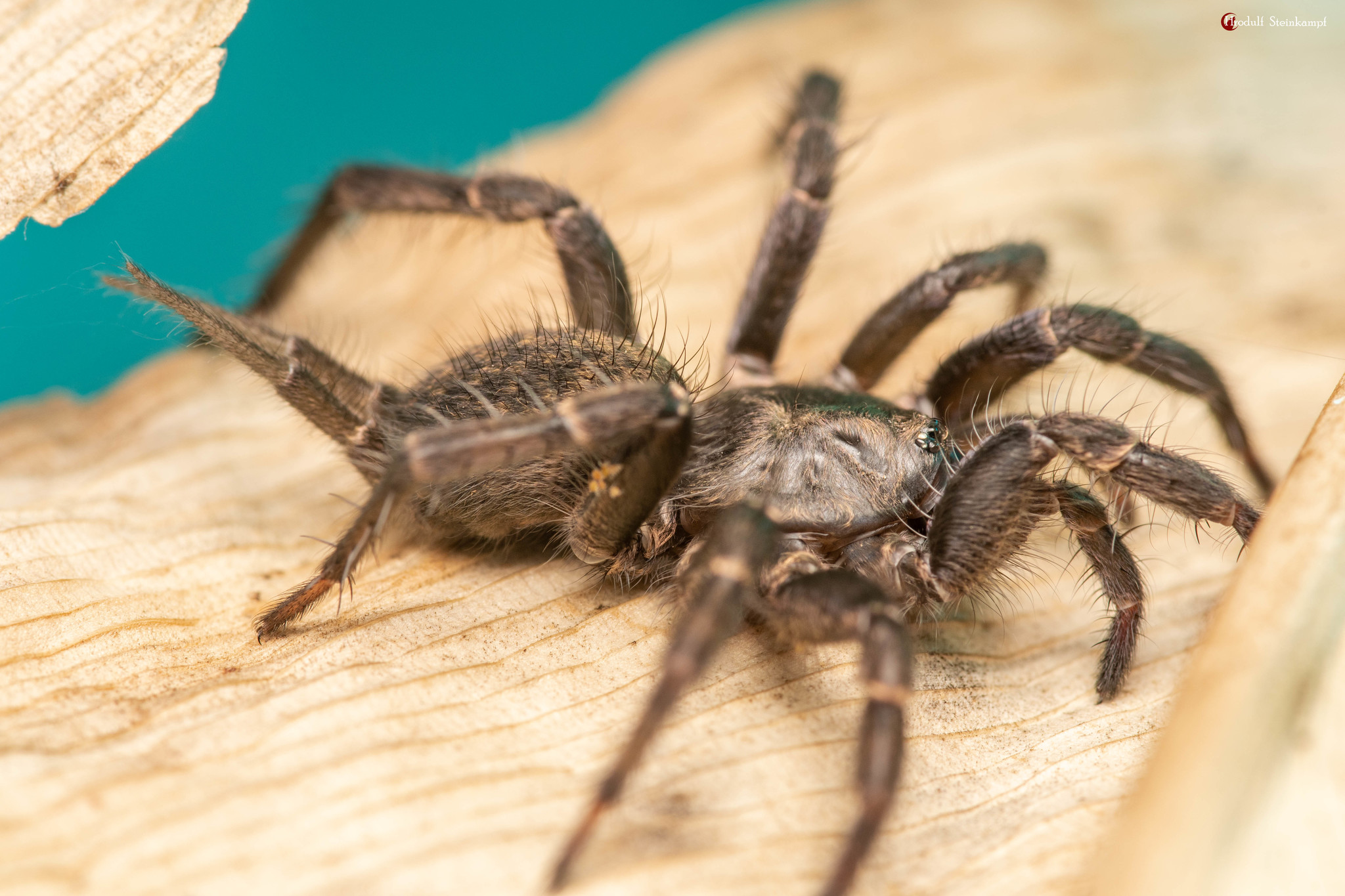
- female
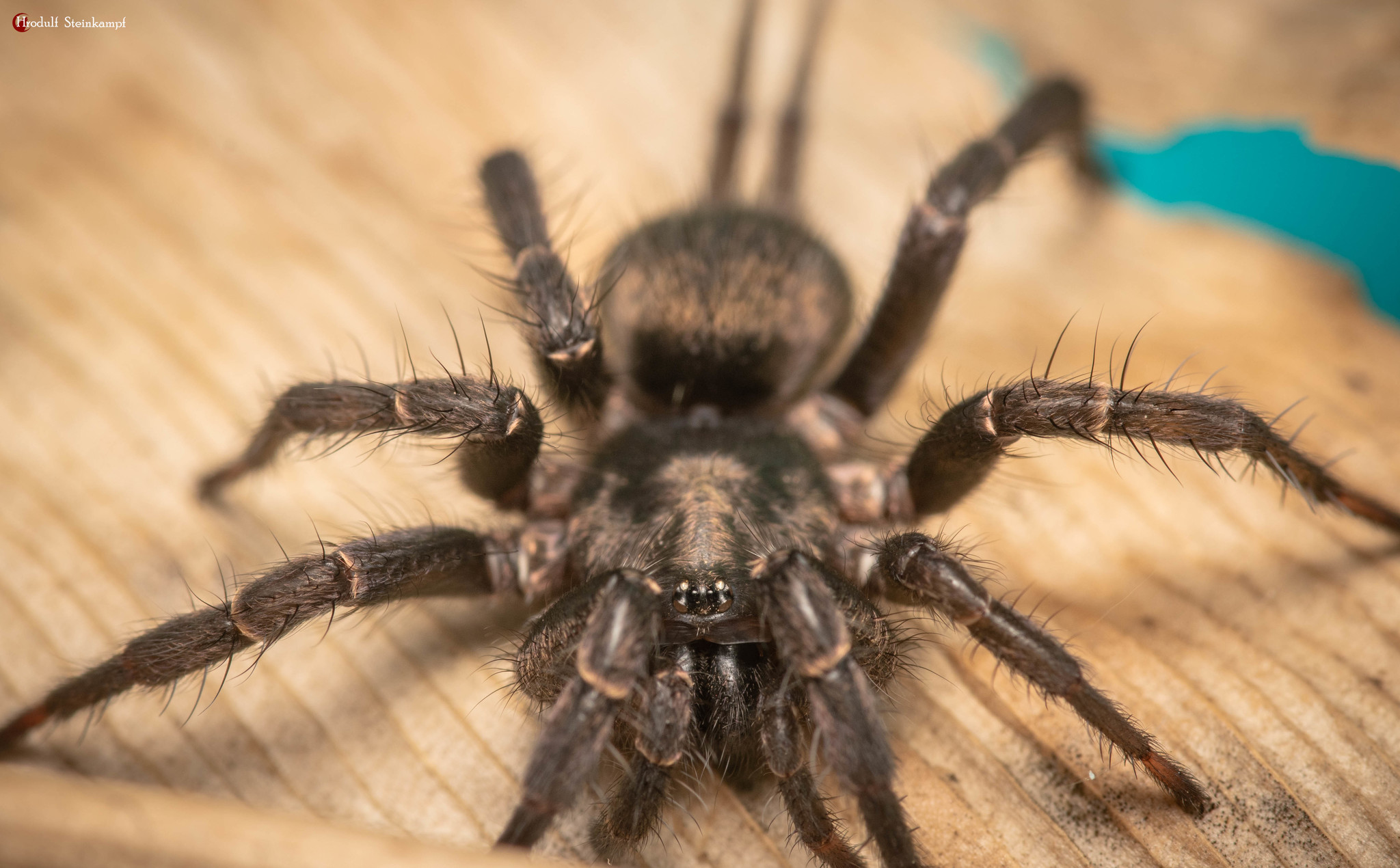
- female

Scientific classification
- Kingdom: Animalia
- Phylum: Arthropoda
- Subphylum: Chelicerata
- Class: Arachnida
- Order: Araneae
- Infraorder: Mygalomorphae
- Family: Euagridae
- Genus: Allothele
- Species: A. caffer

Binomial name
- Allothele caffer (Pocock, 1902)

Synonyms
- Euagrus caffer Pocock, 1902; Allothele cafer Bonnet, 1955 (invalid emendation)

= Allothele caffer =

Species of spider

Allothele caffer, commonly known as the Allothele sheet-web spider, is a species of mygalomorph spider in the family Euagridae. It is endemic to South Africa.

== Taxonomy ==
The species was first described by R. I. Pocock in 1902 as Euagrus caffer from specimens collected in Durban, KwaZulu-Natal. It was later transferred to the genus Allothele by Tucker in 1920. The species was comprehensively revised by F. A. Coyle in 1984, who provided detailed morphological descriptions and illustrations.

== Description ==
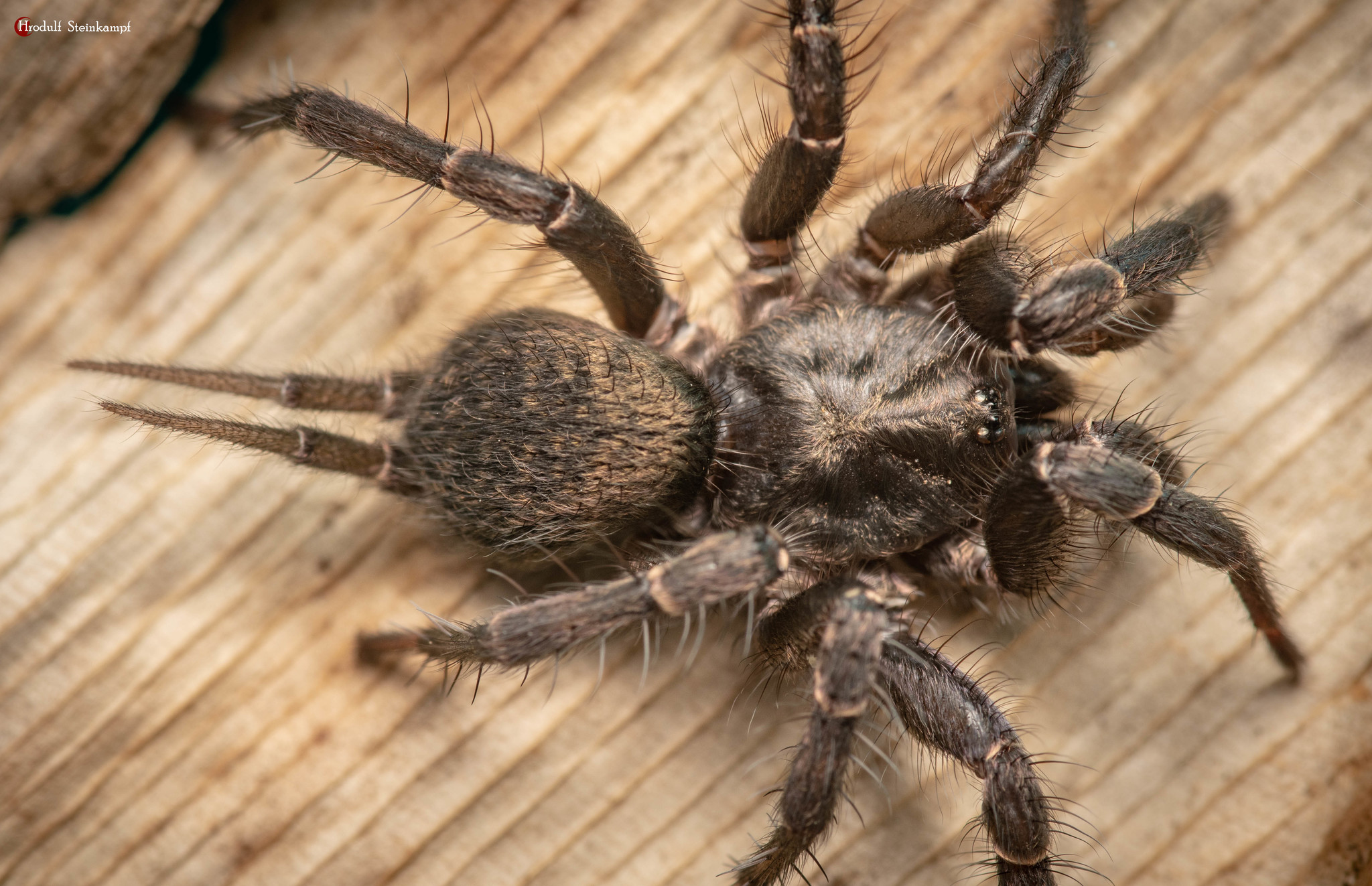
female

Allothele caffer exhibits significant sexual dimorphism in its reproductive structures. Females have distinctively shaped spermathecae with short, broad trunks at the base and lateral bulbs that are thick-walled and irregular, often with forward-projecting lobes.

Males can be distinguished by their characteristic pedipalps. In retrolateral view, the basal three-fifths of the embolus is broad and then tapers abruptly to a long, thin, straight portion that curves only at its tip. The tibia of the second leg bears a distinctive apophysis positioned on the ventral aspect of the prolateral surface, with its base attached well distal of the tibia midpoint. The metatarsus of the second leg has an apophysis with a rounded apex and apical spine.

The carapace ranges from light orange-brown to medium brown, while the abdominal opisthosoma is pale tan to medium brown in coloration.

== Distribution and habitat ==
Allothele caffer is endemic to South Africa, with a distribution spanning three provinces. The species has been recorded from the Eastern Cape, KwaZulu-Natal, and coastal areas of Natal. It is found at elevations ranging from 17 to 1,316 meters above sea level.

The spider inhabits Grassland and Savanna biomes, where it constructs sheet-webs with funnel retreats. Specific localities include Durban and nearby areas such as The Bluff, Burman Bush, and Umhlali, as well as protected areas like Umhlanga Lagoon Nature Reserve and Vernon Crookes Nature Reserve.

== Conservation status ==
Allothele caffer is classified as Least Concern by conservation assessments. The species has a relatively wide geographic range and is protected within several nature reserves. It is suspected to be under-sampled, particularly in the Eastern Cape Province, suggesting the actual distribution may be broader than currently known.

No significant threats have been identified for this species, and no specific conservation actions are currently recommended.
