= Carrai =

Scientific classification
- Domain: Eukaryota
- Kingdom: Animalia
- Phylum: Arthropoda
- Subphylum: Chelicerata
- Class: Arachnida
- Order: Araneae
- Infraorder: Mygalomorphae
- Family: Euagridae
- Genus: Carrai; Raven, 1984
- Species: C. afoveolata

Binomial name
- Carrai afoveolata Raven, 1984

Genus of spiders

Carrai is a monotypic genus of spiders in the family Euagridae. It contains the single species, Carrai afoveolata. It was first described by Robert Raven in 1984, and is endemic to Australia.
