= Australothele =

Scientific classification
- Domain: Eukaryota
- Kingdom: Animalia
- Phylum: Arthropoda
- Subphylum: Chelicerata
- Class: Arachnida
- Order: Araneae
- Infraorder: Mygalomorphae
- Family: Euagridae
- Genus: Australothele; Raven, 1984

Type species
- A. maculata Raven, 1984

Species
- 7, see text

Genus of spiders

Australothele is a genus of Australian spiders in the family Euagridae. It was first described by Robert Raven in 1984.

== Species ==
As of May 2019 the genus contained seven species from New South Wales (NSW) or Queensland (QLD):

- Australothele bicuspidata Raven, 1984 – NSW
- Australothele jamiesoni Raven, 1984 – NSW, QLD
- Australothele maculata Raven, 1984 (type) – QLD
- Australothele magna Raven, 1984 – QLD
- Australothele montana Raven, 1984 – NSW
- Australothele nambucca Raven, 1984 – NSW
- Australothele nothofagi Raven, 1984 – NSW, QLD
