= Chilehexops =

Scientific classification
- Domain: Eukaryota
- Kingdom: Animalia
- Phylum: Arthropoda
- Subphylum: Chelicerata
- Class: Arachnida
- Order: Araneae
- Infraorder: Mygalomorphae
- Family: Euagridae
- Genus: Chilehexops; Coyle, 1986

Type species
- C. platnicki Coyle, 1986

Species
- Chilehexops australis Mello-Leitão, 1939 – Chile; Chilehexops misionensis Goloboff, 1989 – Argentina; Chilehexops platnicki Coyle, 1986 – Chile

Genus of spiders

Chilehexops is a genus of South American spiders in the family Euagridae. It was first described by F. A. Coyle in 1986. As of July 2020 it contained only three species: C. australis, C. misionensis, and C. platnicki.
