= Vilchura =

Scientific classification
- Kingdom: Animalia
- Phylum: Arthropoda
- Subphylum: Chelicerata
- Class: Arachnida
- Order: Araneae
- Infraorder: Mygalomorphae
- Family: Euagridae
- Genus: Vilchura; Ríos-Tamayo & Goloboff, 2017
- Species: V. calderoni

Binomial name
- Vilchura calderoni Ríos-Tamayo & Goloboff, 2017

Genus of spiders

Vilchura is a genus of spiders in the family Euagridae. It was first described in 2017 by Ríos-Tamayo & Goloboff. As of 2017, it contains only one species, Vilchura calderoni, from Chile.
