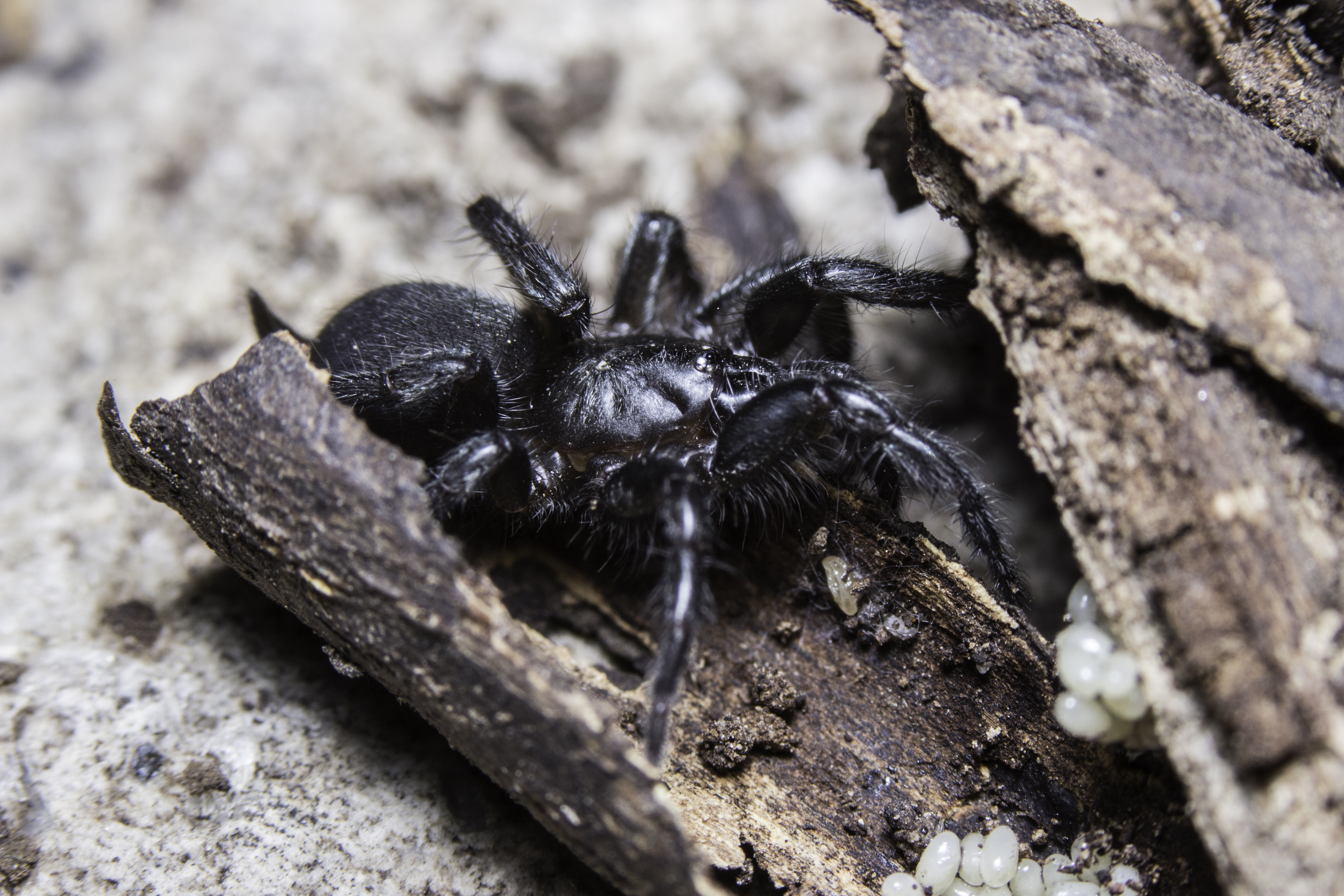
- Euagrus sp.

Scientific classification
- Kingdom: Animalia
- Phylum: Arthropoda
- Subphylum: Chelicerata
- Class: Arachnida
- Order: Araneae
- Infraorder: Mygalomorphae
- Family: Euagridae
- Genus: Euagrus; Ausserer, 1875

Type species
- E. mexicanus Ausserer, 1875

Species
- See text.

= Euagrus =

Genus of spiders

Euagrus is a genus of spider in the family Euagridae. It was first described by Anton Ausserer in 1875. It has been referred to as "Evagrus", but this is a transcript error, not an accepted synonym. It is very similar to the genus Allothele, and several species have been transferred there, including Euagrus caffer, Euagrus regnardi, and Euagrus teretis.

== Species ==
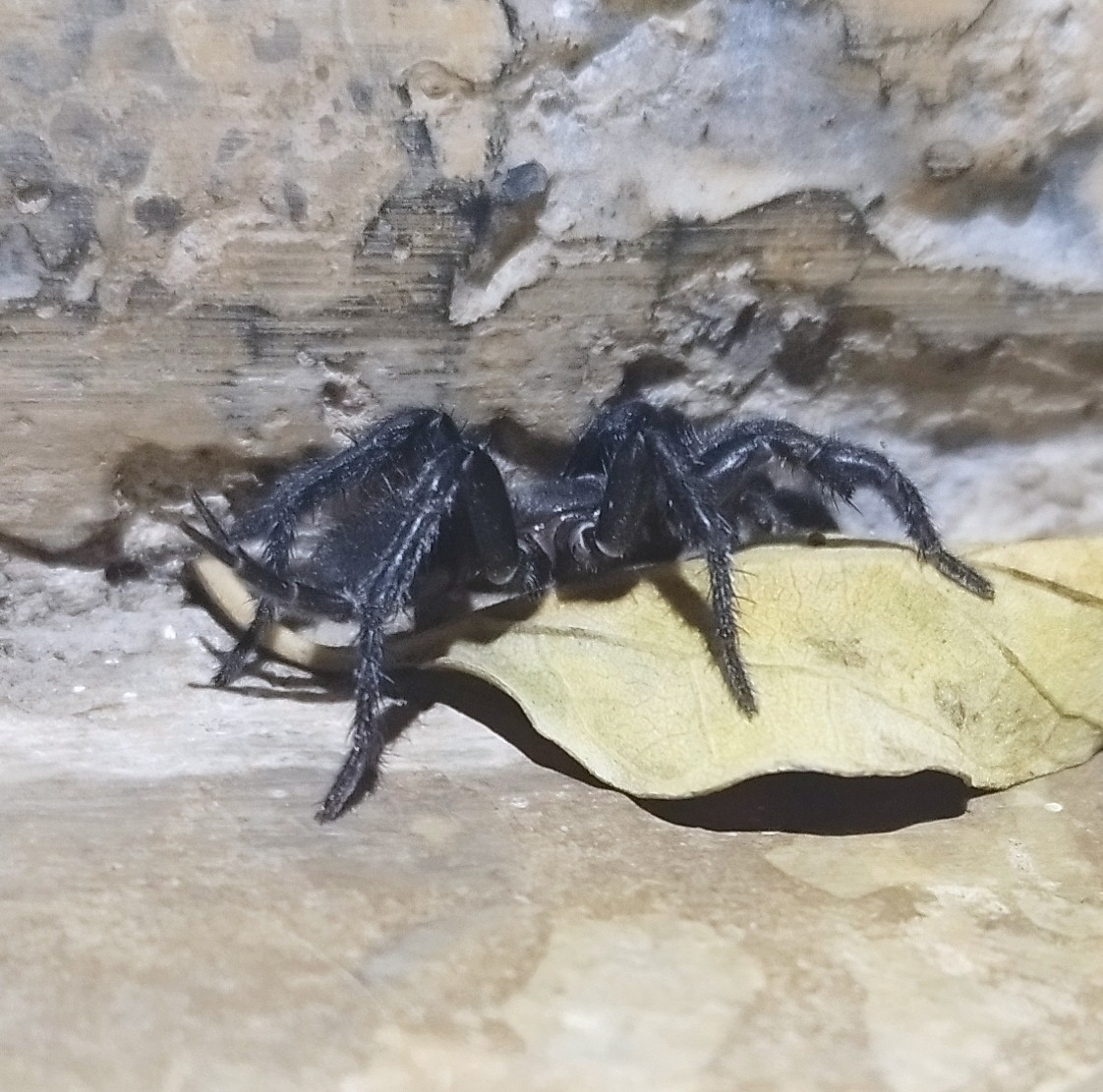
E. carlos

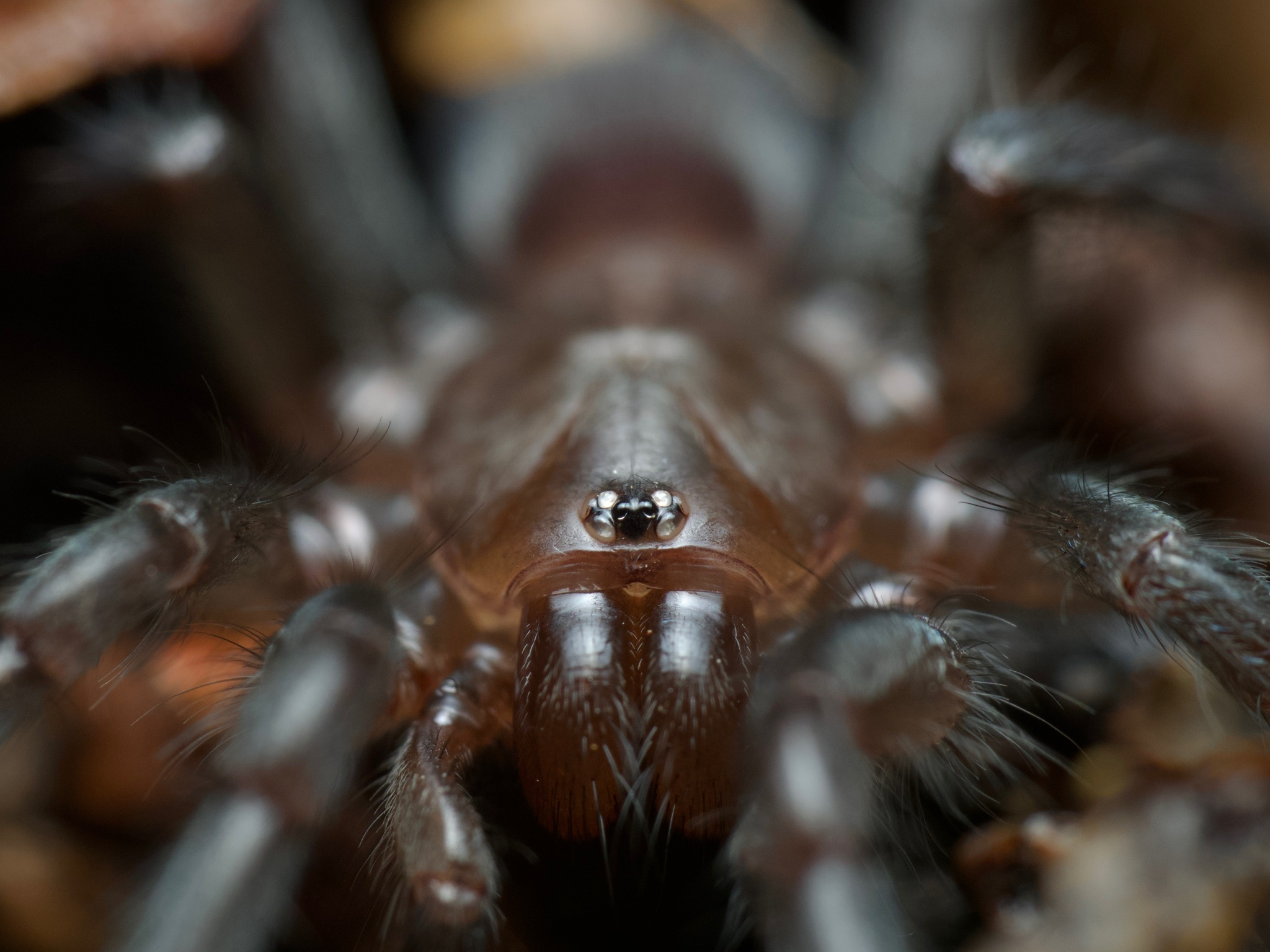
E. chisoseus

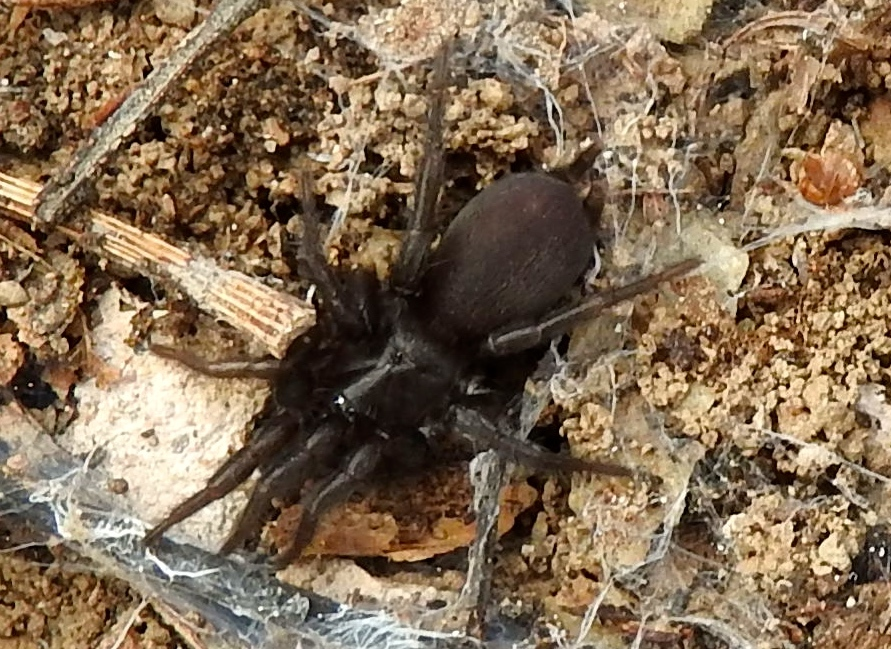
E. gertschi

As of October 2025, this genus includes 22 species:

- Euagrus anops Gertsch, 1973 – Mexico
- Euagrus atropurpureus Purcell, 1903 – South Africa
- Euagrus carlos Coyle, 1988 – Mexico to Costa Rica
- Euagrus cavernicola Gertsch, 1971 – Mexico
- Euagrus charcus Coyle, 1988 – Mexico
- Euagrus chisoseus Gertsch, 1939 – United States, Mexico
- Euagrus comstocki Gertsch, 1935 – United States
- Euagrus formosanus Saito, 1933 – Taiwan
- Euagrus garnicus Coyle, 1988 – Mexico
- Euagrus gertschi Coyle, 1988 – Mexico
- Euagrus guatemalensis F. O. Pickard-Cambridge, 1897 – Guatemala
- Euagrus gus Coyle, 1988 – Mexico
- Euagrus josephus Chamberlin, 1924 – Mexico
- Euagrus leones Coyle, 1988 – Mexico
- Euagrus luteus Gertsch, 1973 – Mexico
- Euagrus lynceus Brignoli, 1974 – Mexico, Guatemala
- Euagrus mexicanus Ausserer, 1875 – Mexico (type species)
- Euagrus pristinus O. Pickard-Cambridge, 1899 – Mexico
- Euagrus rothi Coyle, 1988 – United States
- Euagrus rubrigularis Simon, 1890 – Mexico
- Euagrus troglodyta Gertsch, 1982 – Mexico
- Euagrus zacus Coyle, 1988 – Mexico
