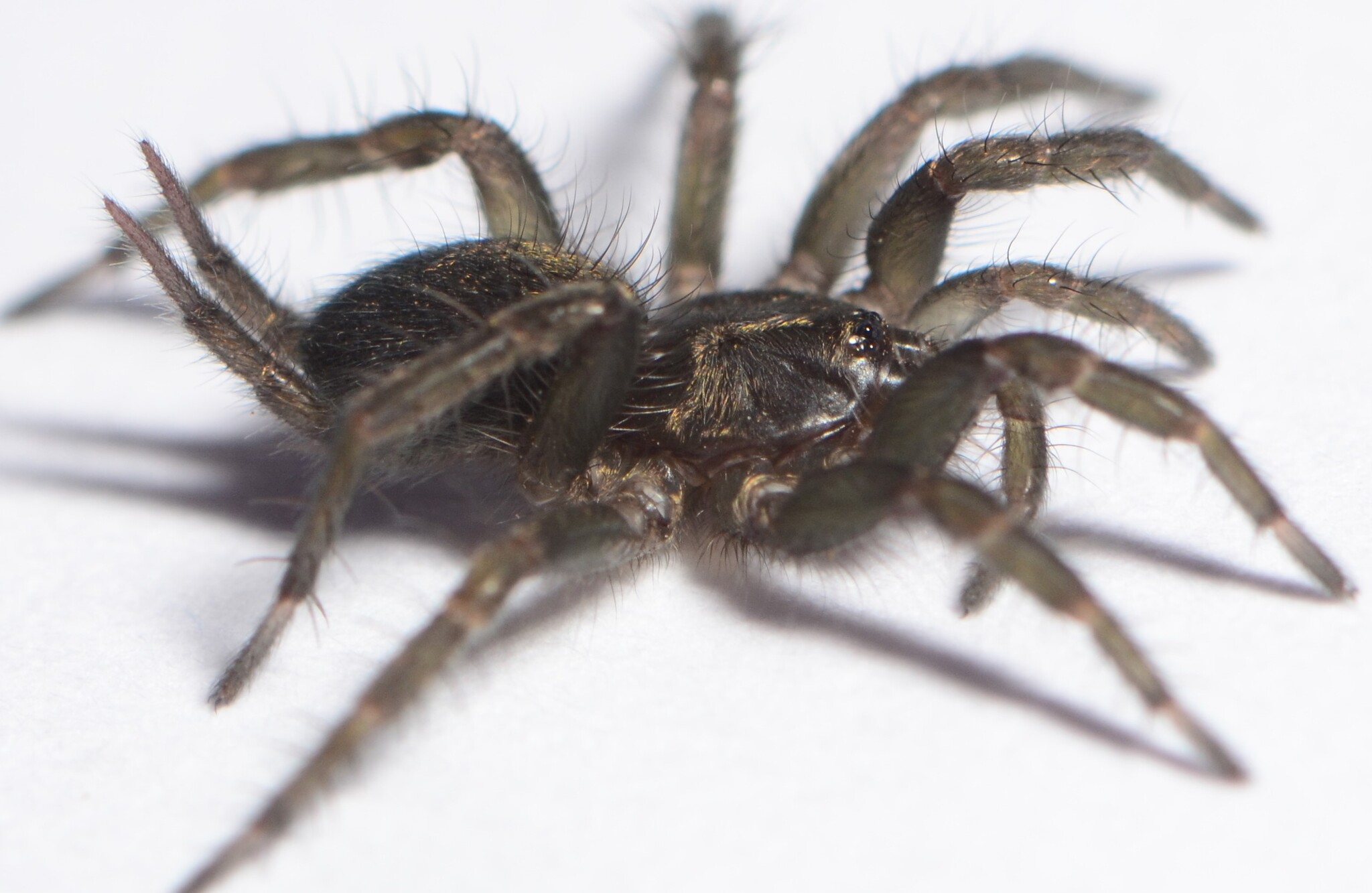
- Female A. teretis
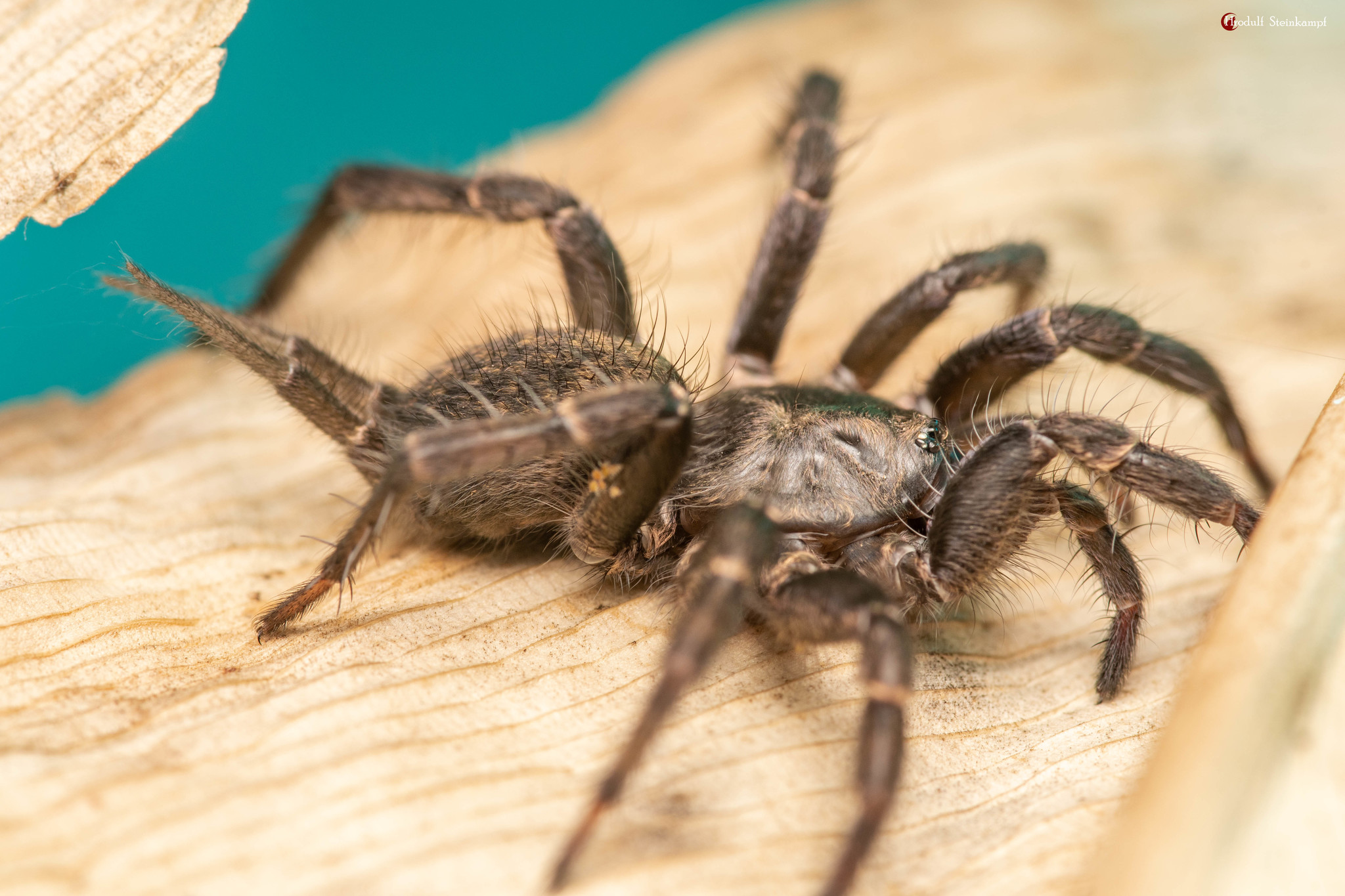
- Female A. caffer

Scientific classification
- Kingdom: Animalia
- Phylum: Arthropoda
- Subphylum: Chelicerata
- Class: Arachnida
- Order: Araneae
- Infraorder: Mygalomorphae
- Family: Euagridae
- Genus: Allothele; Tucker, 1920

Type species
- A. caffer (Pocock, 1902)

Species
- 5, see text

= Allothele =

Allothele sheet-web spiders

Genus of spiders

Allothele is a genus of African spiders in the family Euagridae. It was first described by R. W. E. Tucker in 1920. The genus comprises a distinctive group of spiders living in southern Africa, commonly known as Allothele sheet-web spiders.

== Description ==
Allothele spiders are medium-sized, with a body length of 8–12 mm. The cephalothorax and opisthosoma are medium to dark brown in colour, with the carapace displaying distinctive radiating stripes. The carapace is covered with dense hair consisting of thin, recumbent setae.

The eyes are arranged in a compact quadrangle that is wider than long. The fovea appears as a deep transverse groove, usually recurved, with two erect setae positioned side-by-side in front of it. Small, round sigilla of subequal size are present on the sternum. The endites and labium lack cuspules, distinguishing them from some related families.

The chelicerae possess a furrow with 9–14 medium-sized to large teeth on the promargin and 6–50 teeth along the proximal one-third on the retrolateral side. The oval abdomen is hairy, with median spinnerets that are short and unsegmented, featuring a distinct hirsute sclerite just anterior to the base. The posterior spinnerets are longer than the carapace, with the terminal segment longer than either the basal or middle segment.

Leg III is usually longer than legs I or II. Males possess a well-developed non-terminal mating apophysis on tibia II, equipped with stout tooth-like apical and subapical spines. The male palpal bulb is simple and pyriform (pear-shaped) with an elongated, ridged embolus, while females have setae-lined spermathecae.

== Distribution and habitat ==
Allothele species are found in southern Africa, with four of the five known species recorded from South Africa. They appear to be adapted to savanna and forest habitats characterized by dry winters and rainy summer seasons.

== Behaviour and ecology ==
Very little is known about the behaviour and ecology of Allothele species. They construct sheet-webs with funnel-retreats that are partly or wholly sheltered in subterranean cavities, under rocks, in rotten logs, in leaf litter, or under bark. Males abandon their webs to search for mates during the wet summer months. Allothele teretis typically builds a distinctive sheet curtain-web in cool, shady places such as on tree trunks and in or across holes on stream banks.

== Taxonomy ==
The genus was revised by Coyle in 1984.

== Species ==
As of September 2025 it contains five species:

- Allothele australis (Purcell, 1903) – South Africa
- Allothele caffer (Pocock, 1902) (type) – South Africa
- Allothele malawi Coyle, 1984 – Malawi, South Africa
- Allothele regnardi (Benoit, 1964) – Congo, Angola
- Allothele teretis Tucker, 1920 – South Africa
