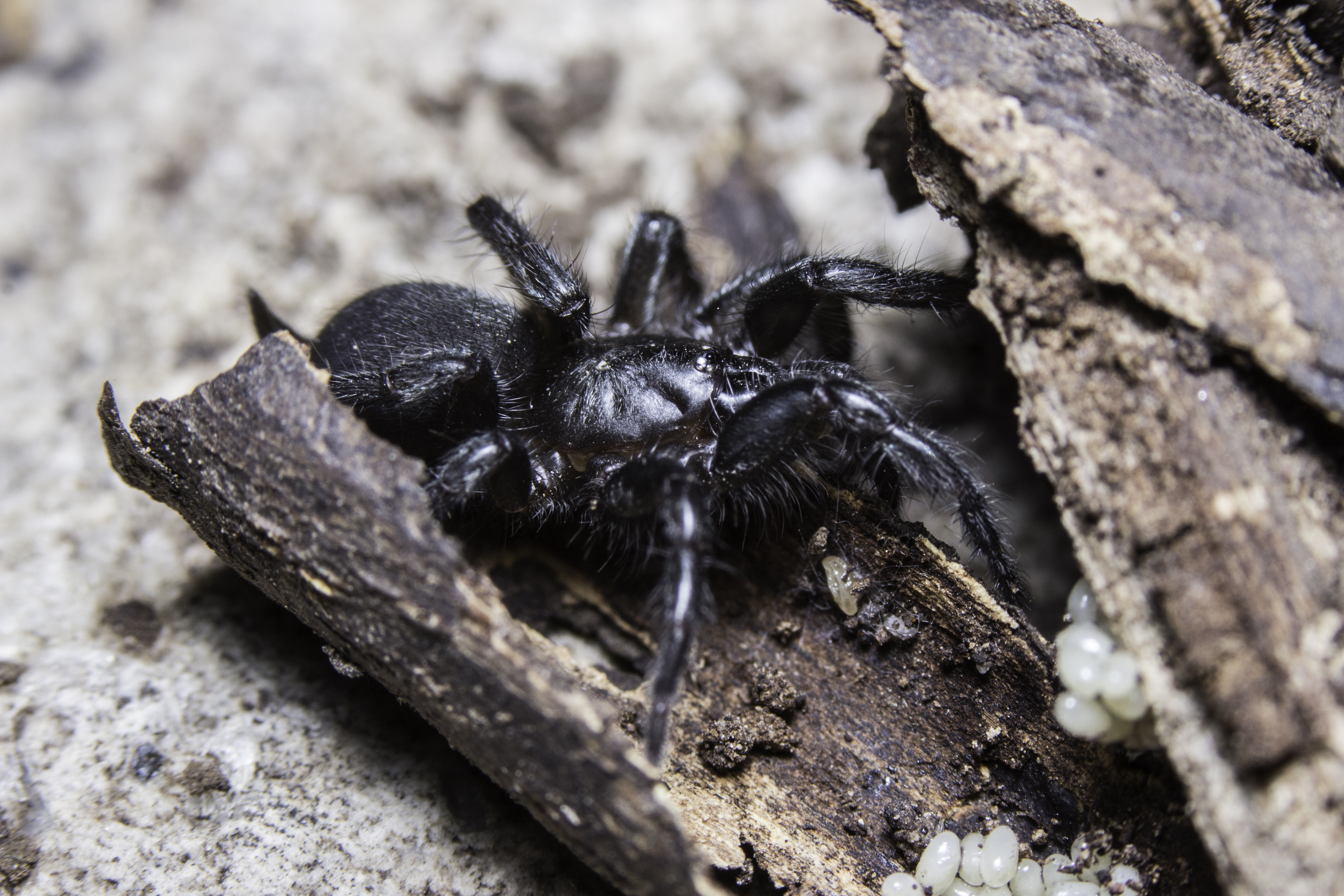
- Euagrus species in Guadalajara, Mexico

Scientific classification
- Kingdom: Animalia
- Phylum: Arthropoda
- Subphylum: Chelicerata
- Class: Arachnida
- Order: Araneae
- Infraorder: Mygalomorphae
- Clade: Avicularioidea
- Family: Euagridae; Raven, 1979

Genera
- See text.
- blue: reported countries (WSC) green: observation hotspots (iNaturalist)

= Euagridae =

Family of spiders

Euagridae is a family of mygalomorph spiders. The group was first described as a tribe in 1979 by Robert Raven, who in 1985 elevated it to a subfamily. In 2020, Opatova et al. elevated it further to a family.

== Genera ==
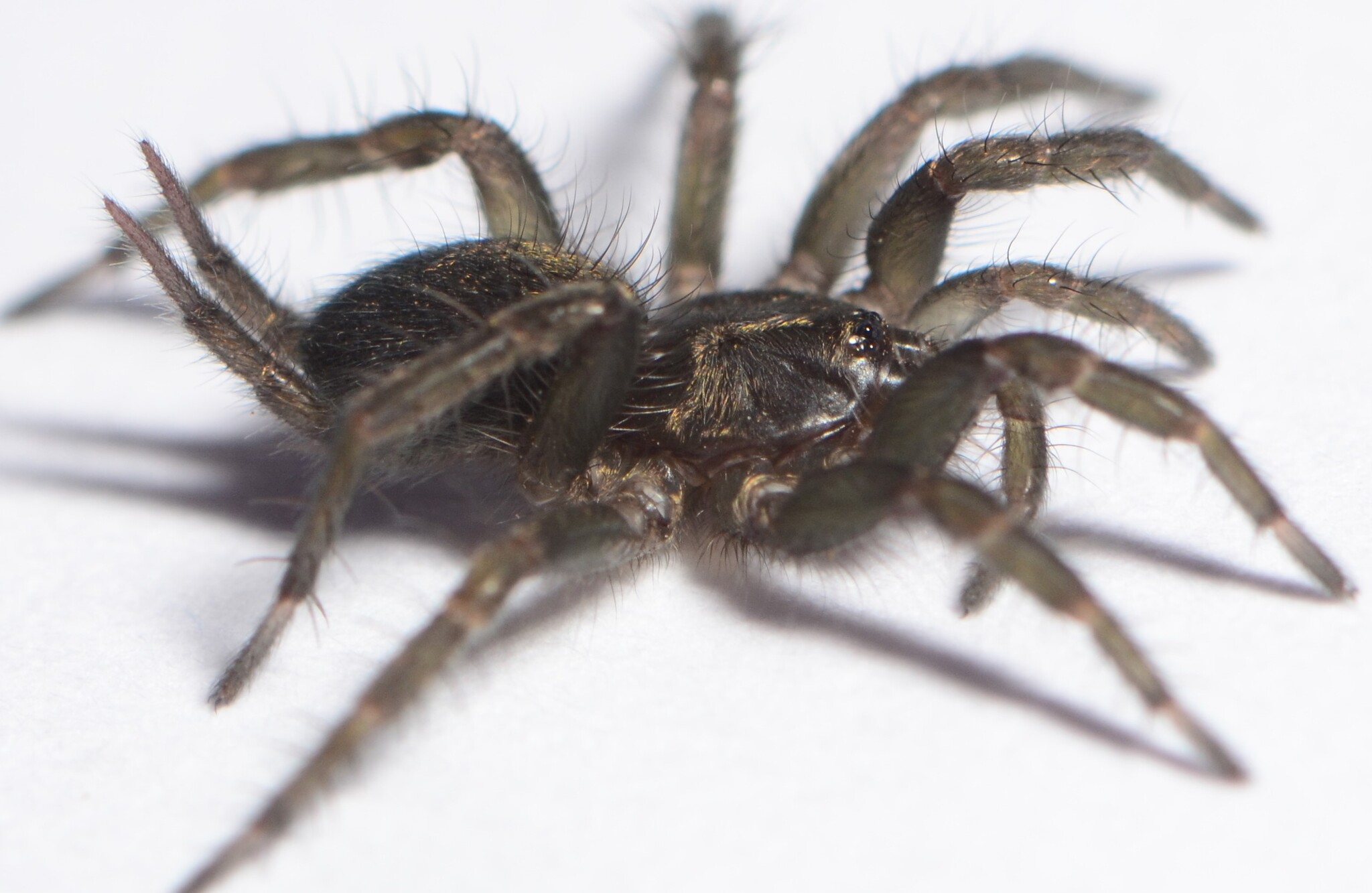
Allothele teretis

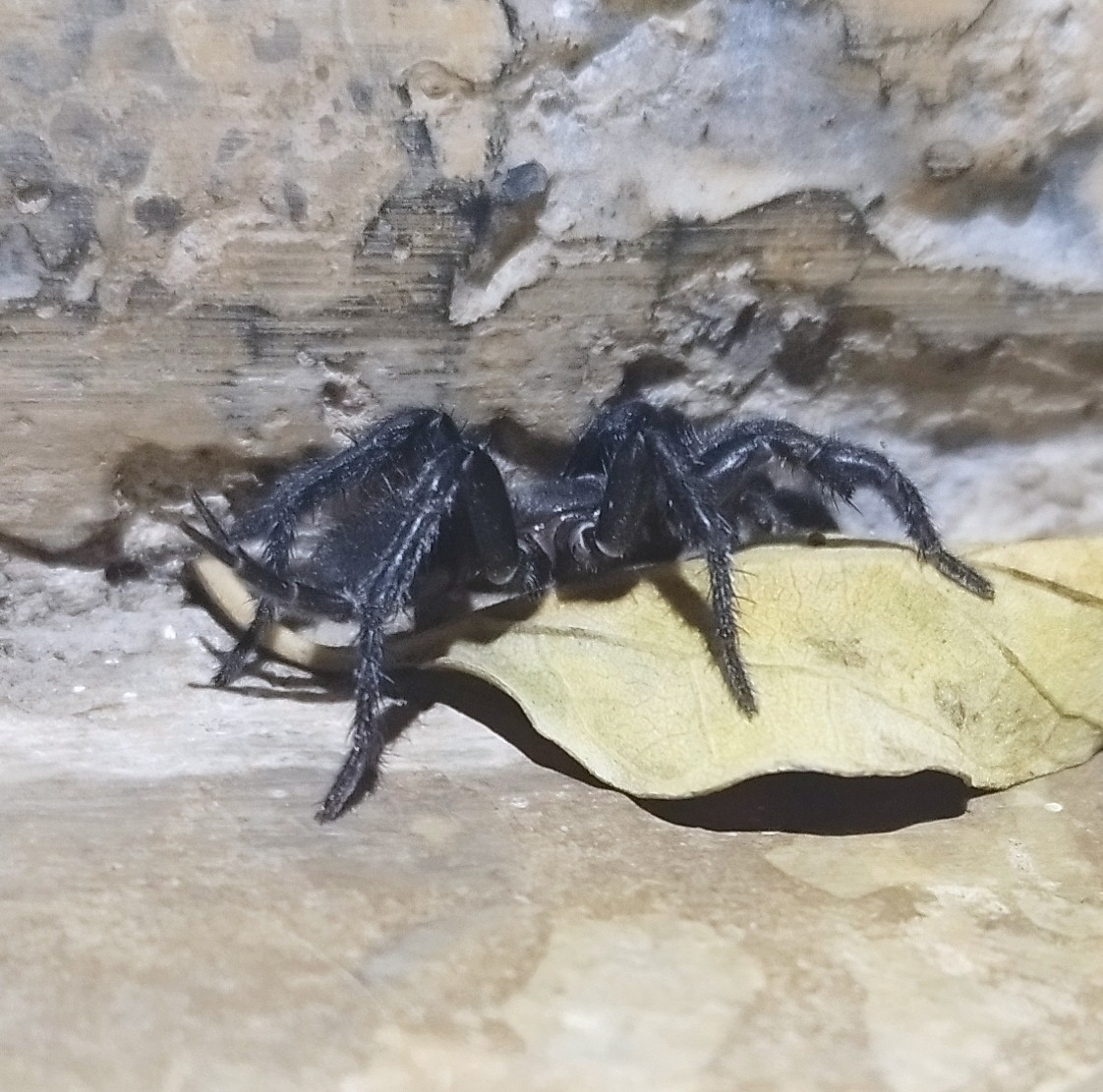
Euagros carlos

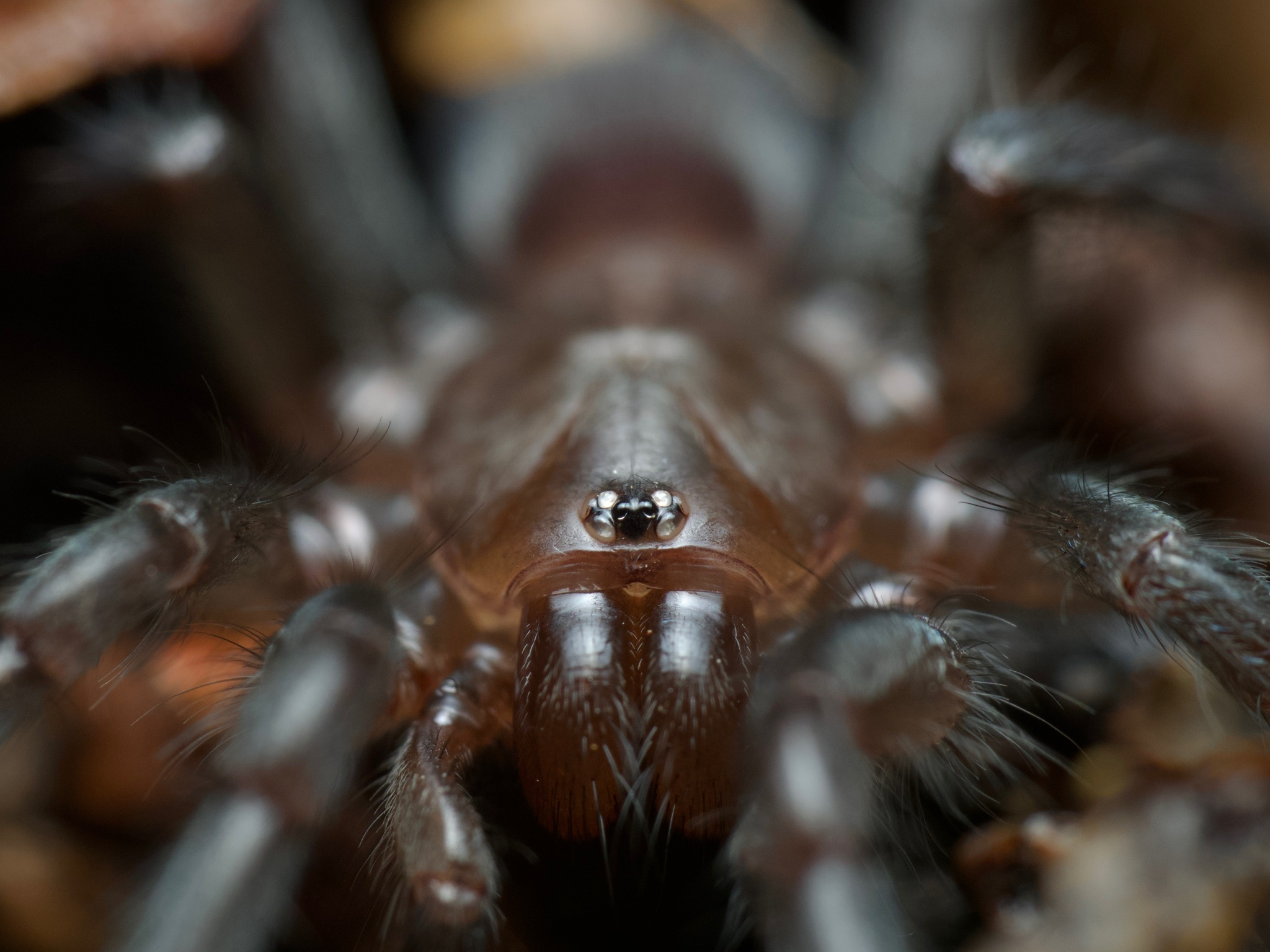
E. chisoseus

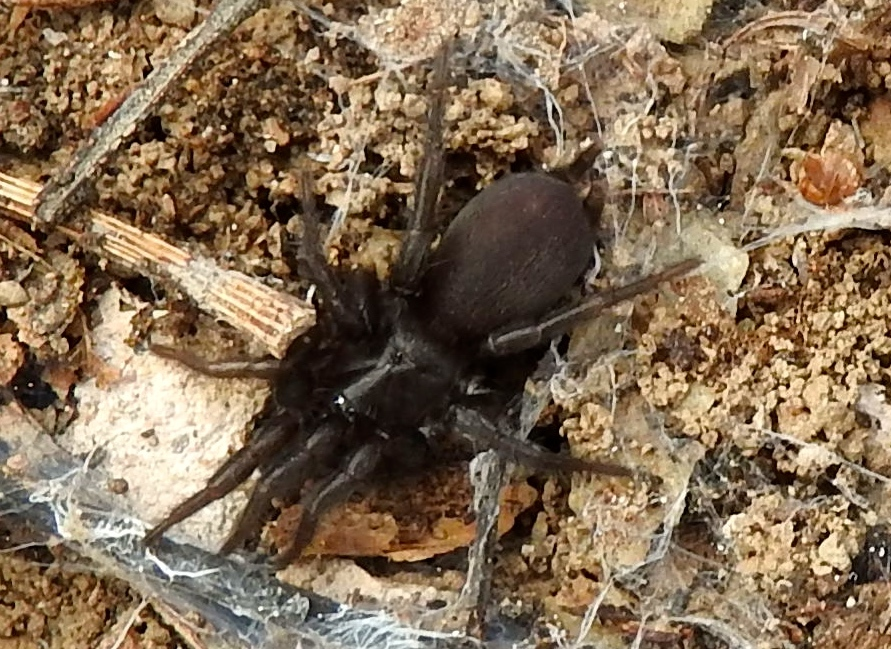
E. gertschi

As of October 2025, this family includes fourteen genera:

- Allothele Tucker, 1920 – Angola, DR Congo, Malawi, South Africa
- Australothele Raven, 1984 – Australia
- Caledothele Raven, 1991 – Australia, New Caledonia, Loyalty Islands
- Carrai Raven, 1984 – Australia
- Cethegus (spider) Thorell, 1881 – Australia
- Chilehexops Coyle, 1986 – Argentina, Chile
- Chinothele Yu, S. Y. Zhang & F. Zhang, 2021 – China
- Euagrus Ausserer, 1875 – South Africa, Taiwan, Guatemala, Mexico, United States
- Leptothele Raven & Schwendinger, 1995 – Thailand
- Malayathele Schwendinger, 2020 – Malaysia
- Namirea Raven, 1984 – Australia
- Phyxioschema Simon, 1889 – Asia
- Stenygrocercus Simon, 1892 – New Caledonia
- Vilchura Ríos-Tamayo & Goloboff, 2017 – Chile
