= Leaf litter sieve =

Piece of equipment used by entomologists

A leaf litter sieve is a piece of equipment used by entomologists to extract invertebrates from leaf litter. It consists of a frame fitted with a coarse mesh or gauze that allows invertebrates to fall through, while retaining the leaf litter.

== History ==
Leaf litter sieving emerged as a practical method used by entomologists, in particular by coleopterists (beetle collectors) (Cooter 1991, page 7) as an aid to finding invertebrates in leaf litter. The simple method was then built on by Antonio Berlese in 1905, creating the Berlese funnel, and further by Albert Tullgren in 1918, creating the Tullgren funnel.

== Structure ==
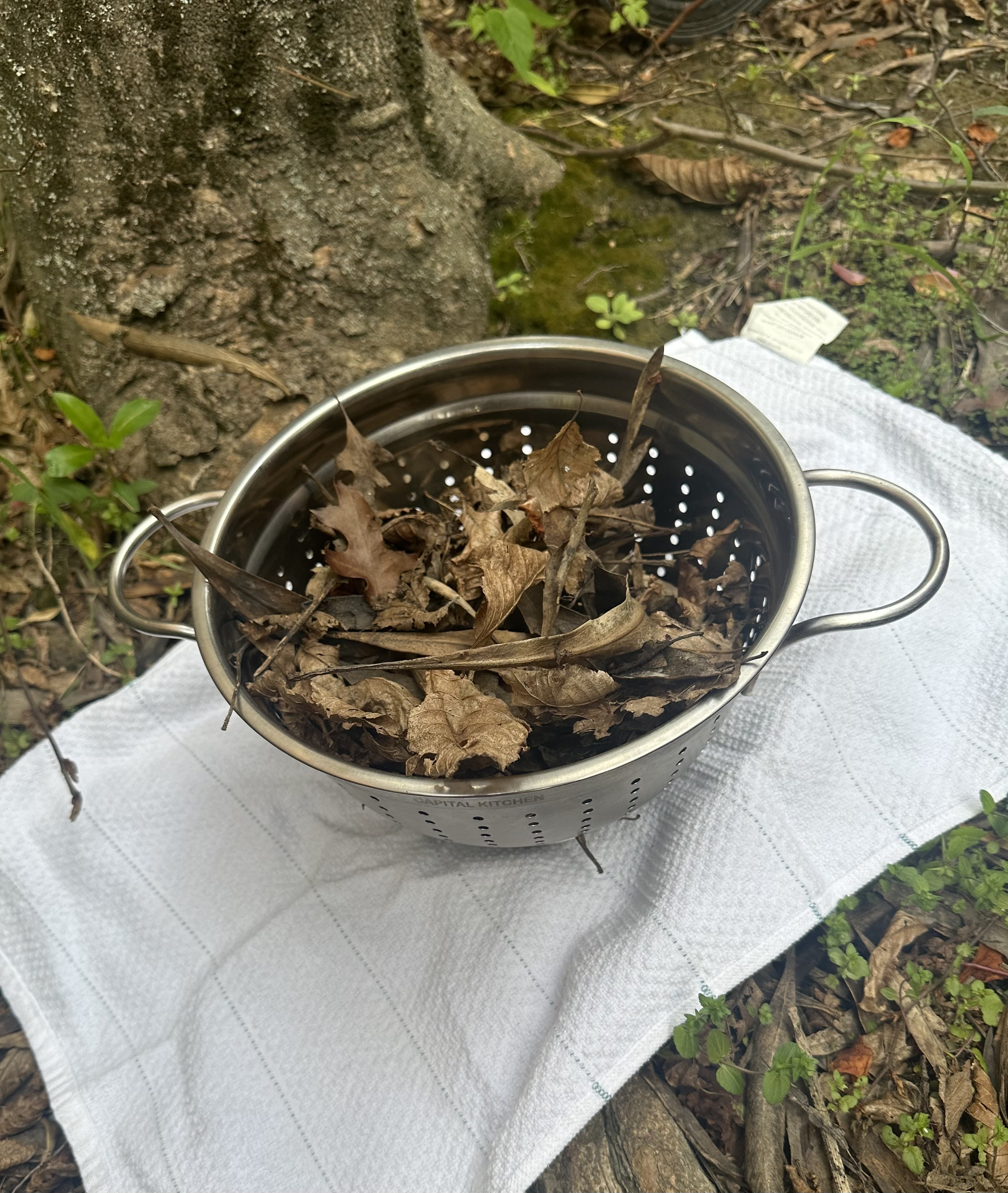
Colander being used as makeshift leaf litter sieve.

A leaf litter sieve has a similar structure to a strainer. The frame is usually square or circular, made of wood, metal, or plastic. A typical leaf litter sieve consists of the base of the sieve covered in mesh or gauze. Charles Valentine Riley described a simple form of leaf litter sieve consisting of a cloth bag, open at the top for inserting litter, with the bottom serving as the sieve base. A more complex combination sieve is described by Hongfu.

The holes are typically approximately 5 to 10 mm in width. The size of the holes can be tailored to target the extraction of specific groups of invertebrates based on body size. Invertebrates can be classed as microfauna, mesofauna, or macrofauna. Figure 2 in Soil and Litter Sampling provides a helpful reference for classifying soil fauna by body size, which can guide sieve selection and sampling strategy. The sieve can be stacked with meshes with holes of various widths, allowing for the separation of different invertebrates based on size as they fall through the successive layers.

Simple and inexpensive versions of a leaf litter sieve can be improvised from common household items such as a colander or cooling rack. Leaf litter sieves may be constructed from simple materials, with mesh, gauze, or perforated plastic forming the base and wood or plastic used for the supporting frame. The Conchological Society describes instructions on how to make a sieve for invertebrate collection.

== Sampling process ==
=== Samples ===
Leaf litter is sampled to be used in the leaf litter sieves for the extraction of invertebrates living amongst the litter. Leaf litter accumulates on the ground from trees. Microbes and terrestrial invertebrates live in this leaf litter. Microbes break down and decompose the leaf litter. Leaf litter serves as a critical microhabitat for a diverse assemblage of invertebrates, including detritivores, predators, and decomposers. Invertebrates can consume this leaf litter and also take shelter in it, providing insulation during cold periods. These organisms contribute to essential ecological processes such as decomposition, nutrient cycling, and soil formation. Sampling leaf litter enables researchers to assess biodiversity beneath the surface and identify species that may not be captured by other collection methods.

=== Collection ===
Leaf litter sieves are usually used for collection in fieldwork experiments as they are lightweight and portable. The recommended place to collect a leaf litter sample is from where it has been accumulating underneath trees or at the bottom of slopes. A dry sample will allow for easier extraction of the invertebrates from the leaves. For scientific experiments, a set amount of leaf litter should be collected per sample, allowing for quantitative data, for example, the number of invertebrates per dry weight of leaf litter, volume or area.

=== Method ===
The entomologist places handfuls of leaf litter into the sieve, which is placed above a white sheet or tray. The sieve is manually shaken, and insects are separated from the leaf litter and fall out for inspection. For any invertebrates that are missed, they can be extracted with forceps or a suction device, such as a pooter. Once insects are collected, they are usually stored in 70-90% ethanol as a preservative. Invertebrates can then be observed under a microscope for detailed identification. Leaf litter sieves are often used as a preliminary sorting method before using alternative methods.

== Alternative methods ==
The Berlese funnel, which was later built on to become the Tullgren funnel, and Winkler extractors are alternative methods for insect extraction from leaf litter. Winkler extractors are similar to Tullgren funnels, but they do not require a heat or light source, although they work more effectively with an added heat plate.

== See also ==
- Entomology
- Pooter
- Tullgren funnel
- Berlese funnel
