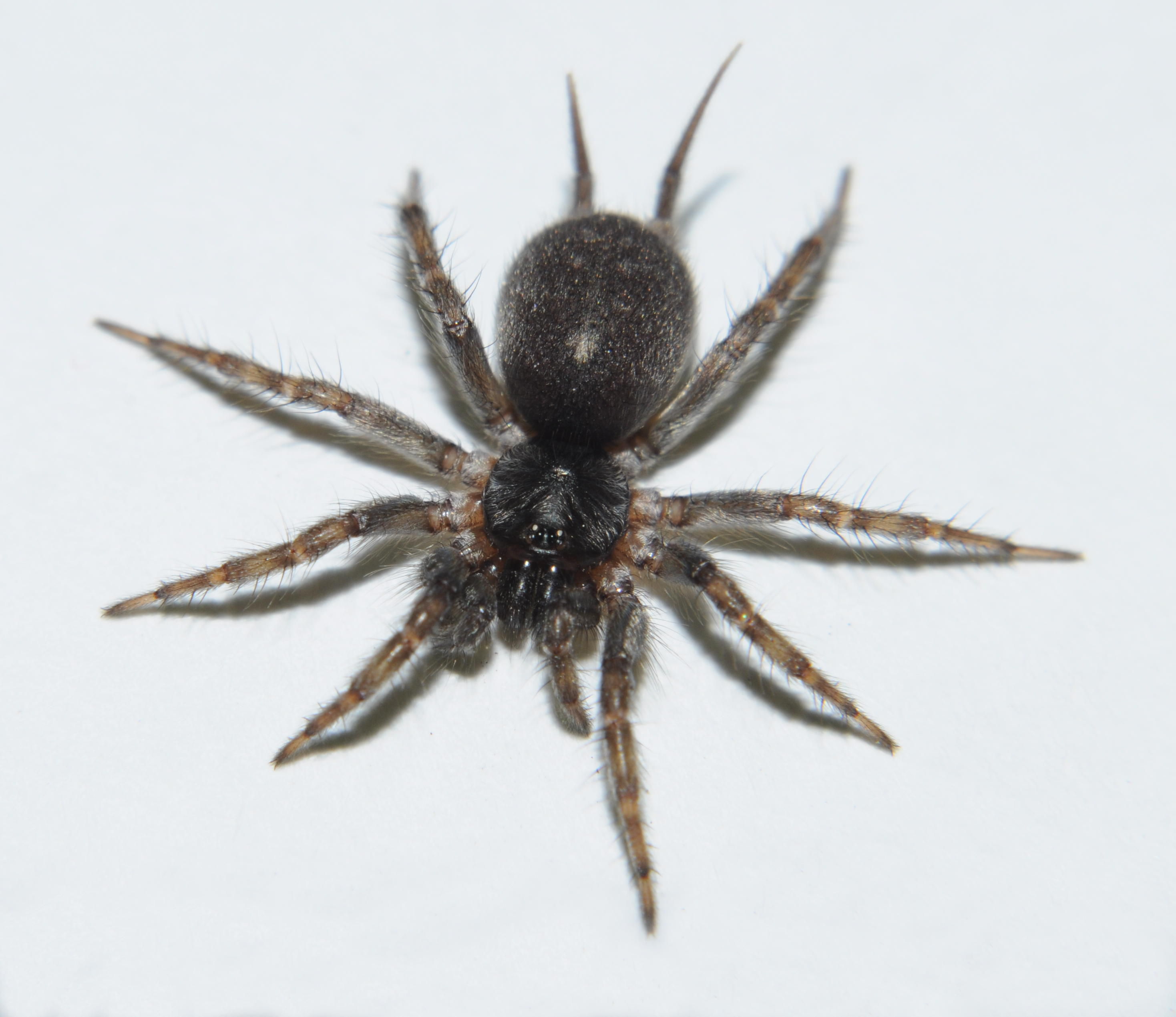
- I. caudata
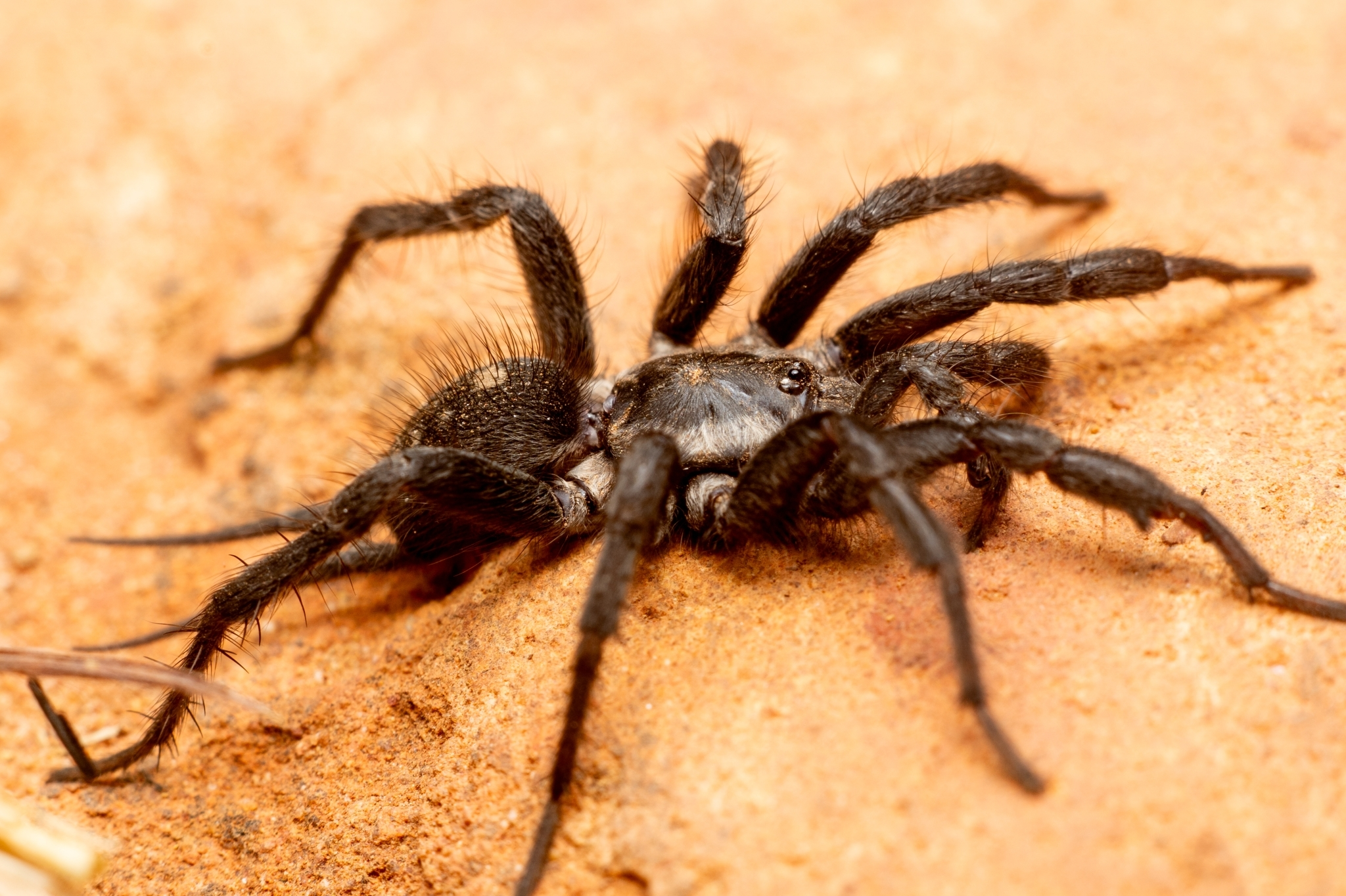
- I. annulata

Scientific classification
- Kingdom: Animalia
- Phylum: Arthropoda
- Subphylum: Chelicerata
- Class: Arachnida
- Order: Araneae
- Infraorder: Mygalomorphae
- Family: Ischnothelidae
- Genus: Ischnothele; Ausserer, 1875

Type species
- I. caudata Ausserer, 1875

Species
- See text.

= Ischnothele =

Scatter-web spiders Temporal range: Neogene–present

Genus of spiders

Ischnothele, also known as scatter-web spiders, is a genus of spiders in the family Ischnothelidae. It was first described by Anton Ausserer in 1875.

== Species ==
As of July 2020 it contained the following species:

- Ischnothele annulata Tullgren, 1905 – Brazil, Bolivia, Paraguay, Argentina
- Ischnothele caudata Ausserer, 1875 (type) – Mexico to Brazil
- Ischnothele digitata (O. Pickard-Cambridge, 1892) – Mexico to El Salvador
- Ischnothele garcia Coyle, 1995 – Hispaniola
- Ischnothele goloboffi Coyle, 1995 – Peru
- Ischnothele guianensis (Walckenaer, 1837) – Peru to Guyana
- Ischnothele huambisa Coyle, 1995 – Peru
- Ischnothele indicola Tikader, 1969 – India
- Ischnothele jeremie Coyle, 1995 – Hispaniola
- Ischnothele longicauda Franganillo, 1930 – Bahama Is., Cuba
- Ischnothele reggae Coyle & Meigs, 1990 – Jamaica
- Ischnothele xera Coyle & Meigs, 1990 – Jamaica
