= Tibioploides =

Scientific classification
- Kingdom: Animalia
- Phylum: Arthropoda
- Subphylum: Chelicerata
- Class: Arachnida
- Order: Araneae
- Infraorder: Araneomorphae
- Family: Linyphiidae
- Genus: Tibioploides; Eskov & Marusik, 1991

Type species
- T. pacificus Eskov & Marusik, 1991

Species
- 7, see text

Genus of spiders

Tibioploides is a genus of sheet weavers that was first described by K. Y. Eskov & Y. M. Marusik in 1991.

== Species ==
As of May 2019 it contains seven species, found in Estonia and Scandinavia:

- Tibioploides arcuatus (Tullgren, 1955) – Scandinavia, Russia, Estonia
- Tibioploides cyclicus Sha & Zhu, 1995 – China
- Tibioploides eskovianus Saito & Ono, 2001 – Japan
- Tibioploides kurenstchikovi Eskov & Marusik, 1991 – Russia
- Tibioploides monticola Saito & Ono, 2001 – Japan
- Tibioploides pacificus Eskov & Marusik, 1991 (type) – Russia
- Tibioploides stigmosus (Xia, Zhang, Gao, Fei & Kim, 2001) – China, Russia (Kurile Is.)
