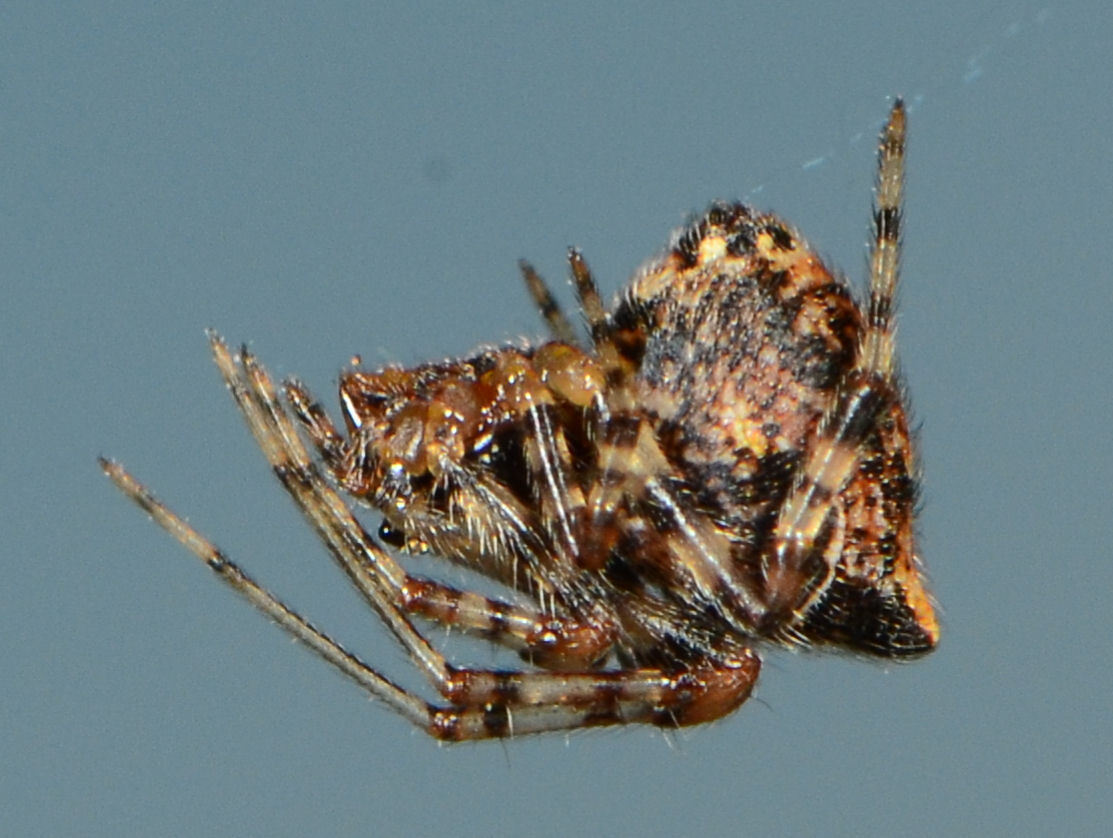
- Female
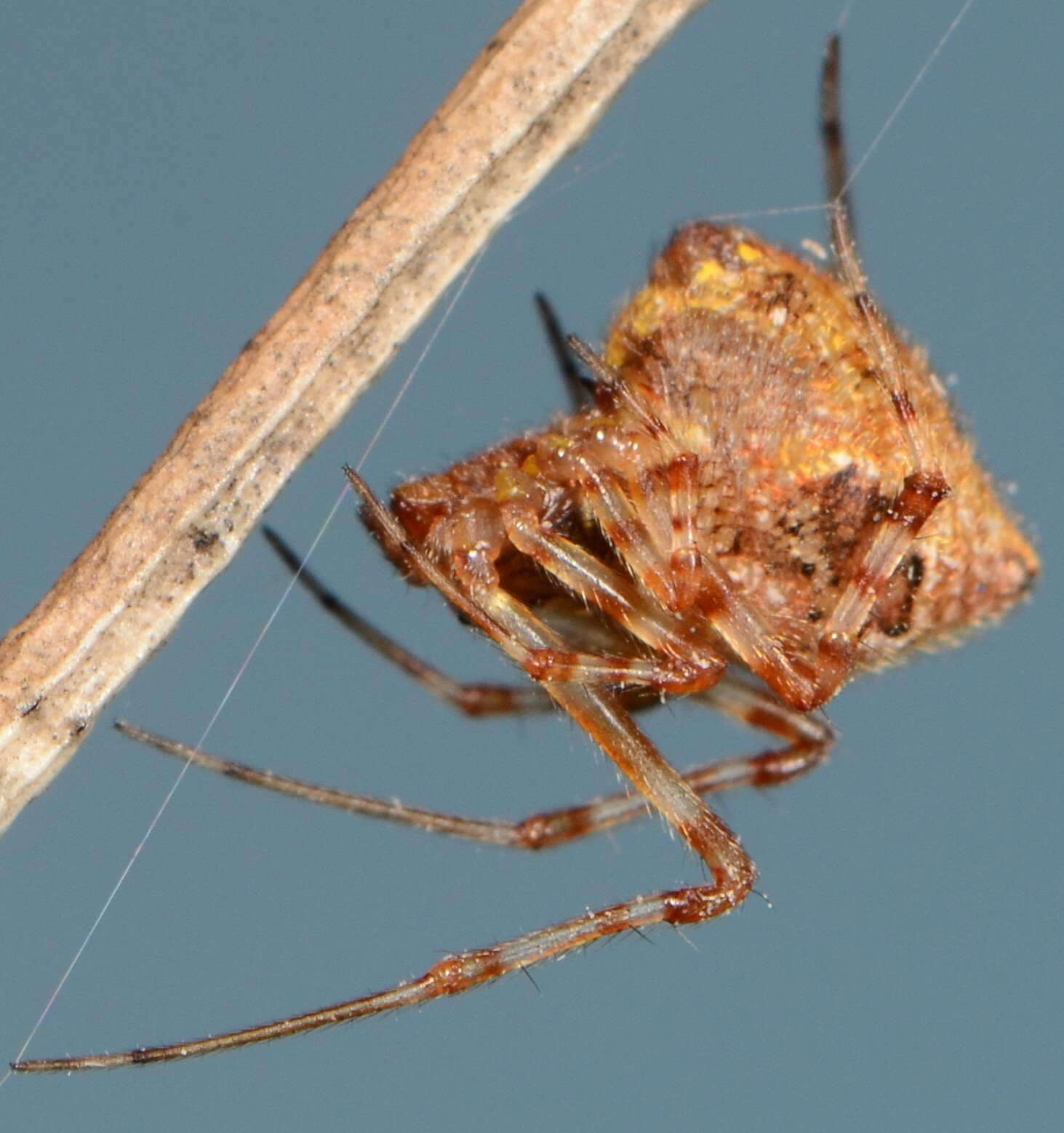
- Female

Scientific classification
- Kingdom: Animalia
- Phylum: Arthropoda
- Subphylum: Chelicerata
- Class: Arachnida
- Order: Araneae
- Infraorder: Araneomorphae
- Family: Theridiidae
- Genus: Tidarren
- Species: T. cuneolatum

Binomial name
- Tidarren cuneolatum (Tullgren, 1910)

Synonyms
- Theridion cuneolatum Tullgren, 1910; Theridion chevalieri Berland, 1936; Tidarren hagemanni Schmidt, 1956; Tidarren pseudogibberosum Schmidt, 1973; Tidarren chevalieri Wunderlich, 1987; Cryptachaea amilcari Barrientos & Hernández-Corral, in Hernández-Corral & Barrientos, 2021

= Tidarren cuneolatum =

Species of spider

Tidarren cuneolatum is a species of spider in the family Theridiidae. It is found across Africa, Cape Verde, Canary Islands, Spain, and Yemen

== Distribution ==
Tidarren cuneolatum is known from Ghana, Kenya, Namibia, Nigeria, Senegal, Tanzania, Yemen, Zambia, and South Africa. It has been introduced to Venezuela.

In South Africa it is known from seven provinces.

== Habitat and ecology ==
Tidarren cuneolatum behaves hemi-synanthropically. Its preferred web sites are mainly on stone walls and rock crevices, as well as house walls and window frames, and the stems of large, rough-barked trees. This may explain the synanthropic aspect of this species.

In South Africa, the species has been sampled at altitudes ranging from 31 to 1809 m.

== Description ==
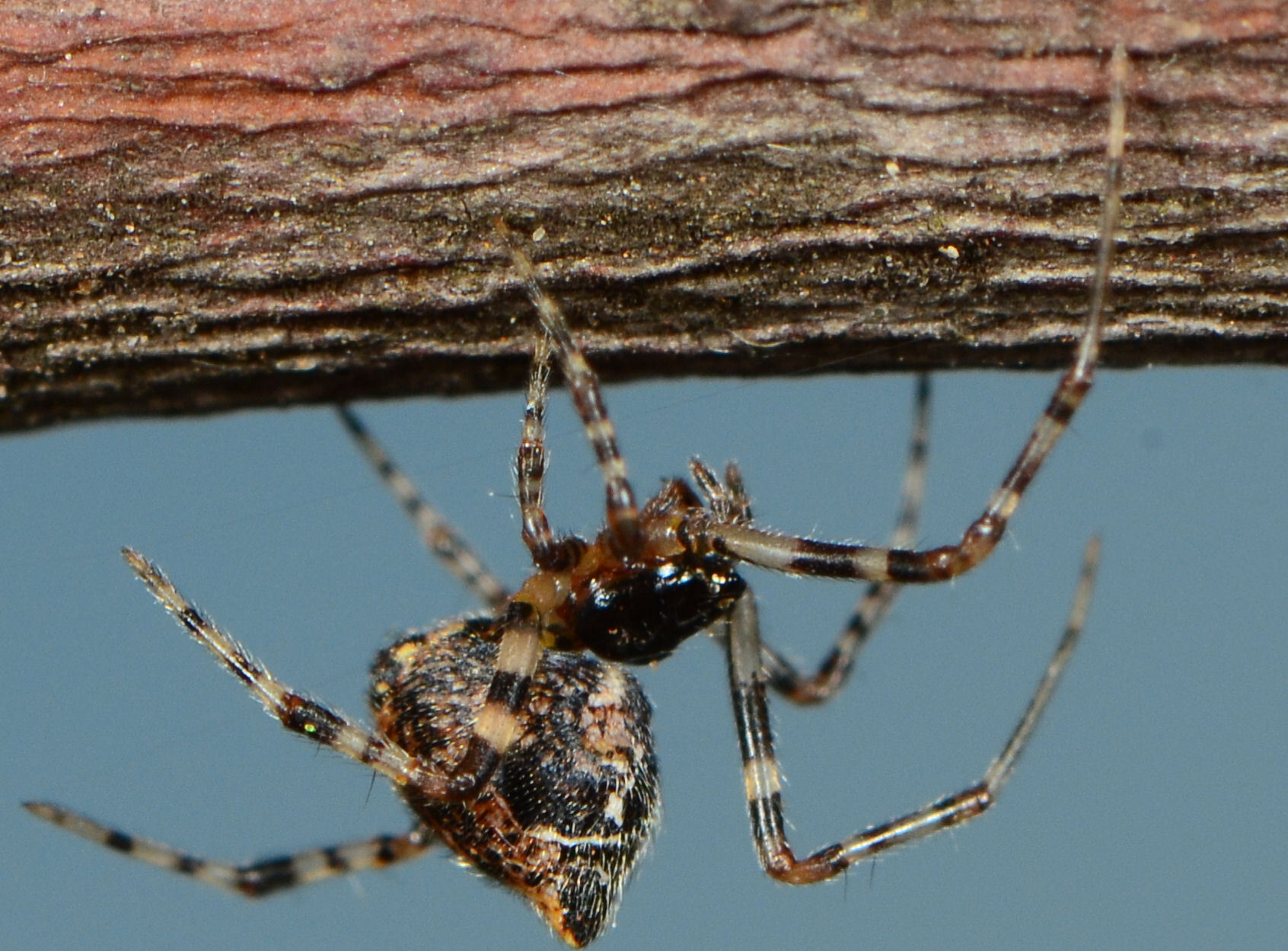
female

== Conservation ==
Tidarren cuneolatum is listed as Least Concern by the South African National Biodiversity Institute due to its large global range.

== Taxonomy ==
Tidarren cuneolatum was originally described by Albert Tullgren in 1910 from Kenya as Theridion cuneolatum. It was revised by Knoflach & Van Harten in 2006, who synonymized several species including Theridion chevalieri. The species is known from both sexes.
