= Notholepthyphantes =

Scientific classification
- Kingdom: Animalia
- Phylum: Arthropoda
- Subphylum: Chelicerata
- Class: Arachnida
- Order: Araneae
- Infraorder: Araneomorphae
- Family: Linyphiidae
- Genus: Notholepthyphantes; Millidge, 1985

Type species
- N. australis (Tullgren, 1901)

Species
- 2, see text

Genus of spiders

Notholepthyphantes is a genus of South American dwarf spiders that was first described by Alfred Frank Millidge in 1985.

== Species ==
As of May 2019 it contains two species:

- Notholepthyphantes australis (Tullgren, 1901) (type) – Chile
- Notholepthyphantes erythrocerus (Simon, 1902) – Chile
