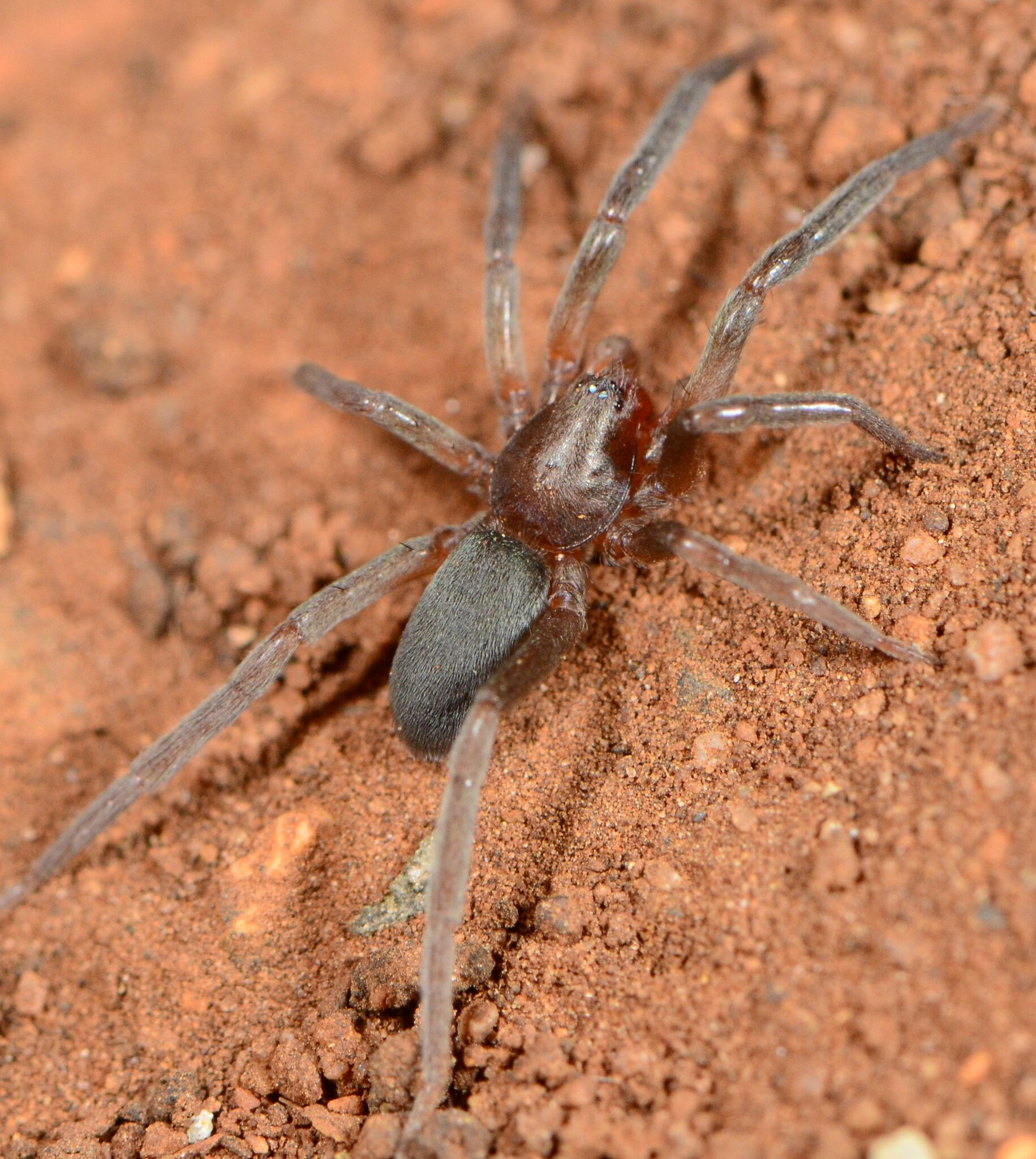
- female

Scientific classification
- Kingdom: Animalia
- Phylum: Arthropoda
- Subphylum: Chelicerata
- Class: Arachnida
- Order: Araneae
- Infraorder: Araneomorphae
- Family: Gnaphosidae
- Genus: Amusia; Tullgren, 1910

Type species
- A. murina Tullgren, 1910

Species
- A. cataracta Tucker, 1923; A. murina Tullgren, 1910

= Amusia (spider) =

Genus of spiders

Amusia is a genus of African ground spiders that was first described by Albert Tullgren in 1910. As of September 2025 it contains only two species, found in East and South Africa.

== Description ==
Spiders of the genus Amusia have a total length of 4-5.1 mm. The carapace is dull brown, darker towards the border, mottled towards the centre, and with a slightly darker V anterior to the striae. The posterior eye row is recurved or straight. The chelicerae have a serrated keel on the retromargin.

The abdomen is light dusky brown, and the spinnerets have 2 fusules. The legs are similar in colour to the carapace. The metatarsi III and/or IV lack a preening comb although a preening brush may be present. The front metatarsi are considerably shorter than the tarsi.

Males are similar in colour to females but are comparatively shorter and broader, with more conspicuous pubescence.

== Species ==
- Amusia cataracta Tucker, 1923 – South Africa
- Amusia murina Tullgren, 1910 – East Africa
