= Notiohyphantes =

Scientific classification
- Kingdom: Animalia
- Phylum: Arthropoda
- Subphylum: Chelicerata
- Class: Arachnida
- Order: Araneae
- Infraorder: Araneomorphae
- Family: Linyphiidae
- Genus: Notiohyphantes; Millidge, 1985

Type species
- N. meridionalis (Tullgren, 1901)

Species
- 3. see text

Genus of spiders

Notiohyphantes is a genus of dwarf spiders that was first described by Alfred Frank Millidge in 1985.

== Species ==
As of May 2019 it contains three species:

- Notiohyphantes excelsus (Keyserling, 1886) – Mexico to Peru, Brazil, Galapagos Islands
- Notiohyphantes laudatus Millidge, 1991 – Brazil
- Notiohyphantes meridionalis (Tullgren, 1901) (type) – Chile
