= Typhochrestus =

Scientific classification
- Kingdom: Animalia
- Phylum: Arthropoda
- Subphylum: Chelicerata
- Class: Arachnida
- Order: Araneae
- Infraorder: Araneomorphae
- Family: Linyphiidae
- Genus: Typhochrestus; Simon, 1884

Type species
- T. digitatus (O. Pickard-Cambridge, 1873)

Species
- 37, see text

Genus of spiders

Typhochrestus is a genus of sheet weavers that was first described by Eugène Louis Simon in 1884.

== Species ==
As of June 2019 it contains thirty-seven species:

- Typhochrestus acoreensis Wunderlich, 1992 – Azores
- Typhochrestus alticola Denis, 1953 – France
- Typhochrestus berniae Bosmans, 2008 – Spain
- Typhochrestus bifurcatus Simon, 1884 – Spain, Algeria
- Typhochrestus bogarti Bosmans, 1990 – Portugal, Spain, France, Morocco
- Typhochrestus brucei Tullgren, 1955 – Sweden
- Typhochrestus chiosensis Wunderlich, 1995 – Greece, Turkey
- Typhochrestus ciliiunti Barrientos & Febrer, 2018 – Spain (Menorca)
- Typhochrestus curvicervix (Denis, 1964) – Tunisia
- Typhochrestus cyrenanius Denis, 1964 – Libya
- Typhochrestus digitatus (O. Pickard-Cambridge, 1873) (type) – Europe, North Africa
- Typhochrestus djellalensis Bosmans & Bouragba, 1992 – Algeria
- Typhochrestus dubius Denis, 1950 – France
- Typhochrestus epidaurensis Wunderlich, 1995 – Greece
- Typhochrestus fortunatus Thaler, 1984 – Canary Is.
- Typhochrestus hesperius Thaler, 1984 – Canary Is.
- Typhochrestus ikarianus Tanasevitch, 2011 – Greece
- Typhochrestus inflatus Thaler, 1980 – Switzerland, Austria, Italy, Caucasus
- Typhochrestus longisulcus Gnelitsa, 2006 – Ukraine
- Typhochrestus madeirensis Crespo, 2013 – Madeira
- Typhochrestus mauretanicus Bosmans, 1990 – Morocco, Algeria
- Typhochrestus meron Tanasevitch, 2013 – Israel
- Typhochrestus montanus Wunderlich, 1987 – Canary Is.
- Typhochrestus numidicus Bosmans, 1990 – Algeria
- Typhochrestus paradorensis Wunderlich, 1987 – Canary Is.
- Typhochrestus pekkai Bosmans & Oger, 2014 – France (Corsica)
- Typhochrestus penevi Komnenov, 2014 – Macedonia
- Typhochrestus pygmaeus (Sørensen, 1898) – Canada, Greenland
- Typhochrestus sardus Bosmans, 2008 – Sardinia
- Typhochrestus simoni Lessert, 1907 – Europe
- Typhochrestus sireti Bosmans, 2008 – Spain
- Typhochrestus spatulatus Bosmans, 1990 – Morocco, Algeria
- Typhochrestus splendidus Bosmans, 1990 – Algeria
- Typhochrestus sylviae Hauge, 1968 – Norway
- Typhochrestus uintanus (Chamberlin & Ivie, 1939) – USA
- Typhochrestus ultimus Bosmans, 1990 – Algeria
- Typhochrestus virilis Bosmans, 1990 – Algeria
