= Tibioploides arcuatus =

Scientific classification
- Kingdom: Animalia
- Phylum: Arthropoda
- Subphylum: Chelicerata
- Class: Arachnida
- Order: Araneae
- Infraorder: Araneomorphae
- Family: Linyphiidae
- Genus: Tibioploides
- Species: T. arcuatus

Binomial name
- Tibioploides arcuatus Tullgren, 1955

Synonyms
- Tibioplus arcuatus Palmgren; Tibioplus arcuatus Millidge; Tibioploides arcuatus Eskov & Marusik

Species of spider

Tibioploides arcuatus is a spider species found in Scandinavia, Russia and Estonia.

The species was first described by Albert Tullgren in 1955.

== Description ==
The males are around 2 millimetres (0.079 in) long, and the females are around 2.1 millimetres (0.083 in) long. The front is yellow to brown, with darker appendages. The abdomen is light grey.
