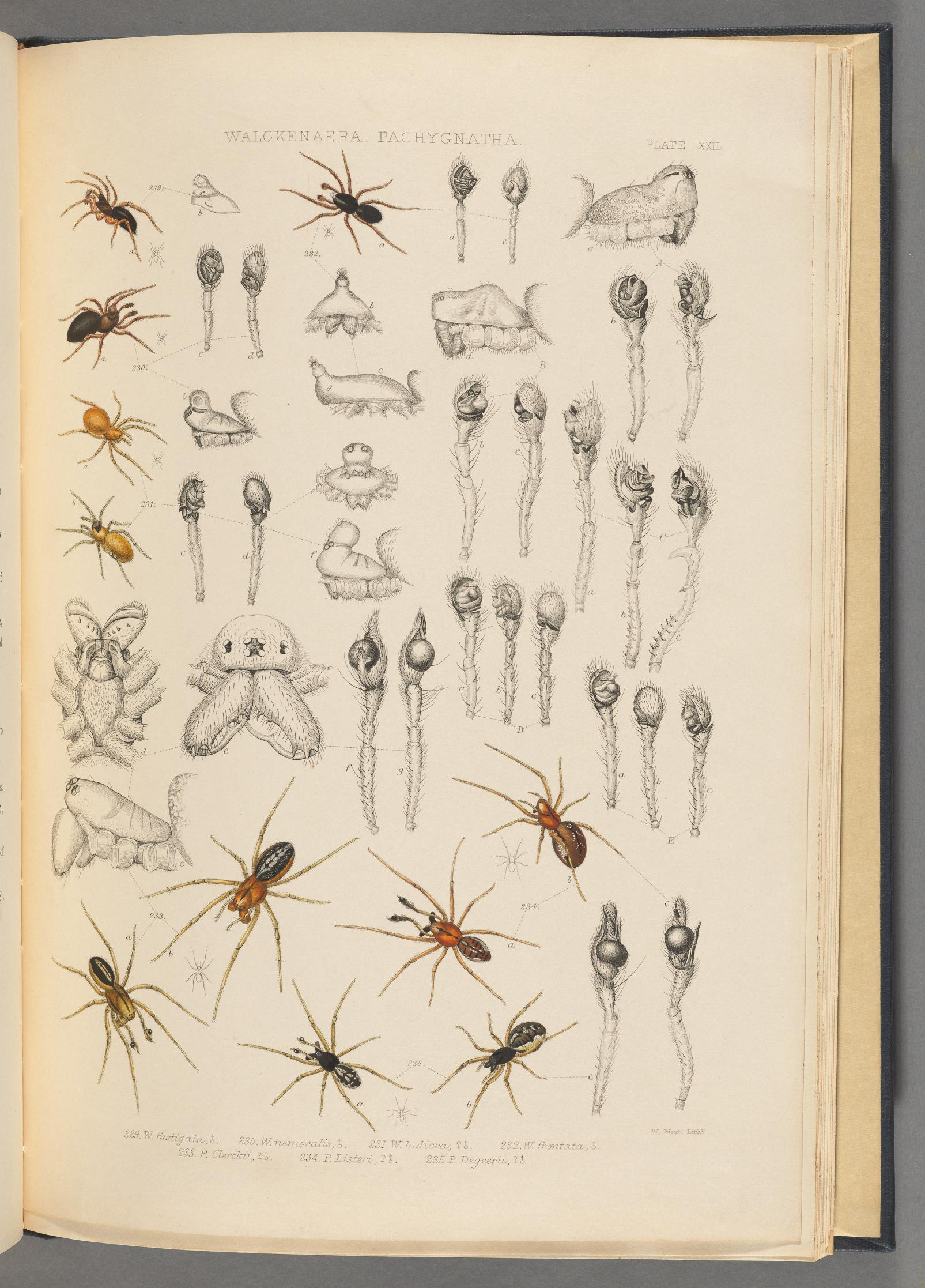
- Peponocranium ludicrum (O. Pickard-Cambridge, 1861) figure 231

Scientific classification
- Kingdom: Animalia
- Phylum: Arthropoda
- Subphylum: Chelicerata
- Class: Arachnida
- Order: Araneae
- Infraorder: Araneomorphae
- Family: Linyphiidae
- Genus: Peponocranium; Simon, 1884

Type species
- P. ludicrum (O. Pickard-Cambridge, 1861)

Species
- 5, see text

= Peponocranium =

Genus of spiders

Peponocranium is a genus of dwarf spiders that was first described by Eugène Louis Simon in 1884.

== Species ==
As of May 2019 it contains five species, found in Europe:

- Peponocranium dubium Wunderlich, 1995 – Mongolia
- Peponocranium ludicrum (O. Pickard-Cambridge, 1861) (type) – Europe, Russia
- Peponocranium orbiculatum (O. Pickard-Cambridge, 1882) – Germany to Russia, Georgia
- Peponocranium praeceps Miller, 1943 – Finland, Germany to Russia, Ukraine
- Peponocranium simile Tullgren, 1955 – Sweden
