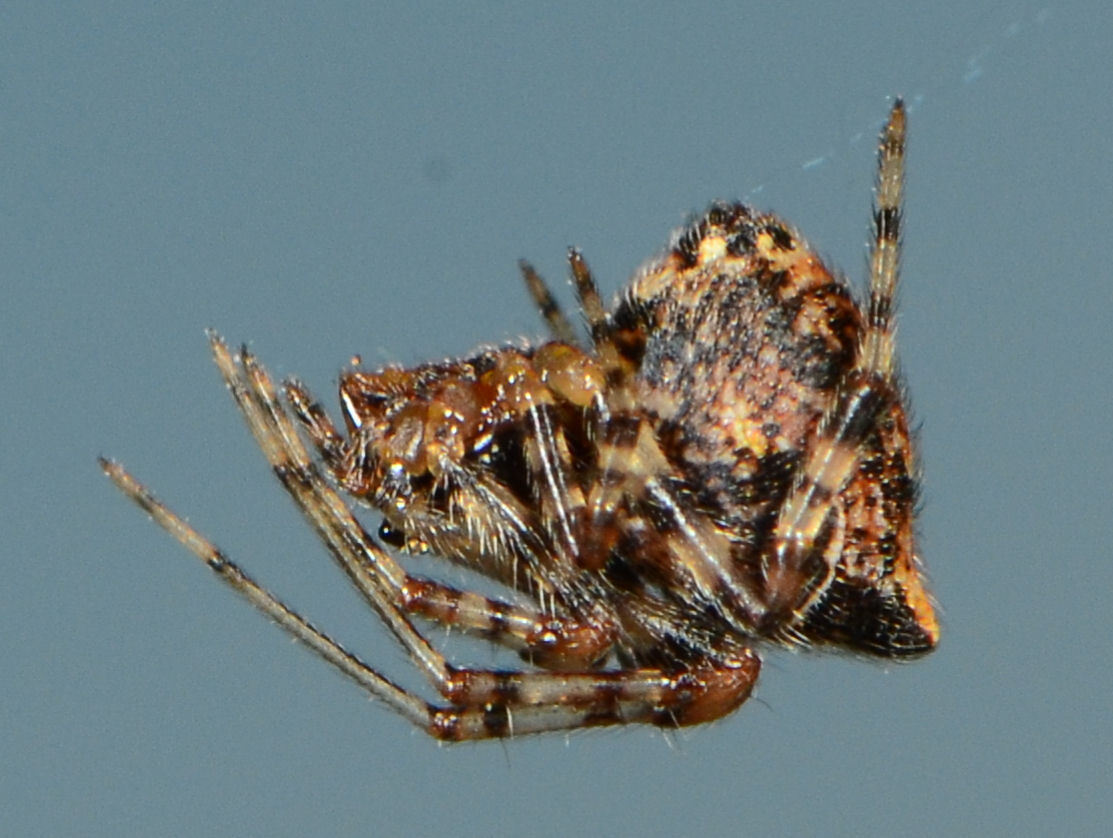
- Female T. cuneolatum
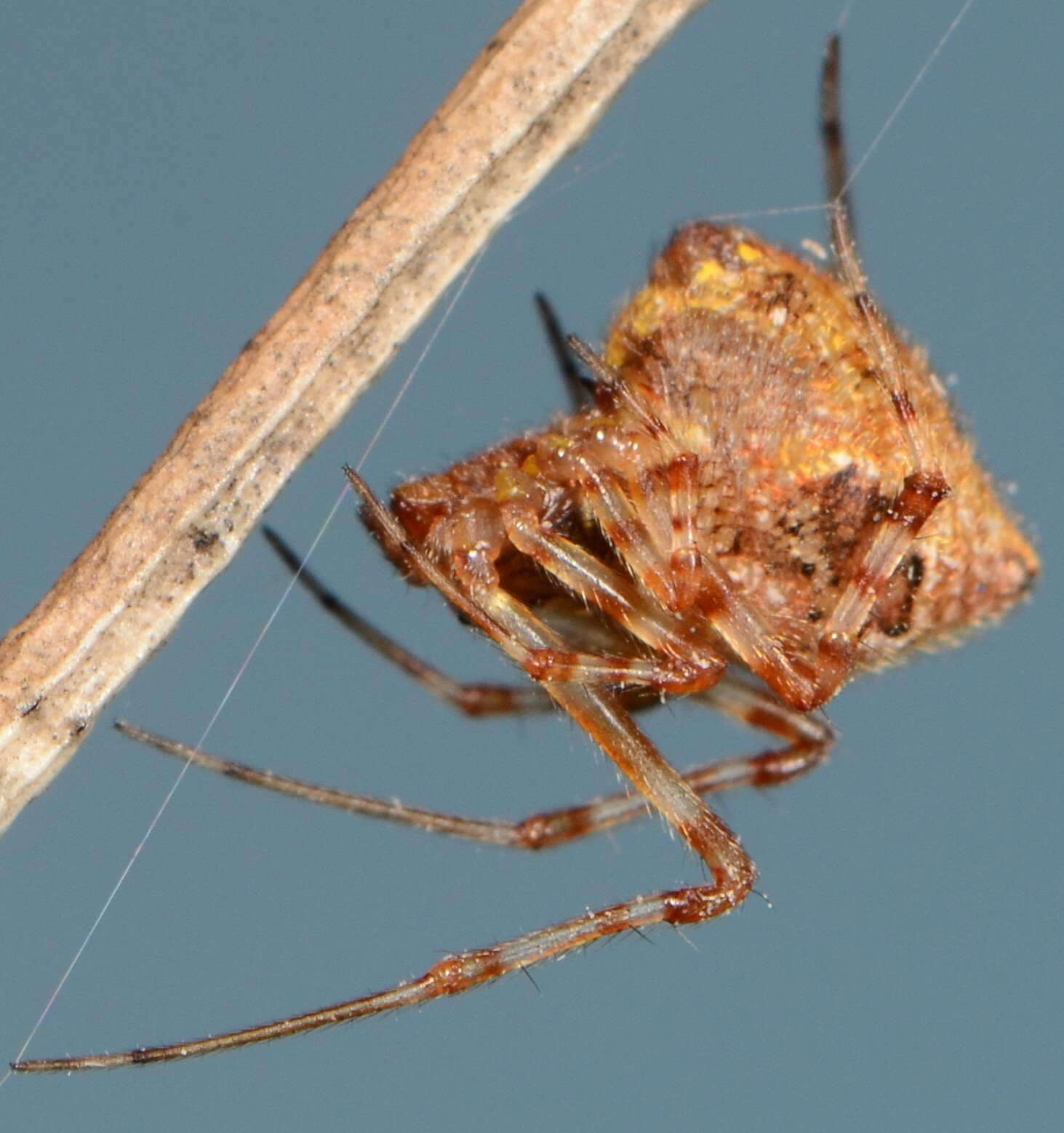
- Female T. cuneolatum

Scientific classification
- Kingdom: Animalia
- Phylum: Arthropoda
- Subphylum: Chelicerata
- Class: Arachnida
- Order: Araneae
- Infraorder: Araneomorphae
- Family: Theridiidae
- Genus: Tidarren; Chamberlin & Ivie, 1934

Type species
- T. sisyphoides (Walckenaer, 1841)

Species
- 24, see text

= Tidarren =

Genus of spiders

Tidarren is a genus of tangle-web spiders first described by Ralph Vary Chamberlin & Wilton Ivie in 1934.

Males are much smaller than females, and they amputate one of their palps before maturation, entering their adult life with only one palp. Though it is uncertain why they do this, it may be done to increase mobility, as the palps are disproportionately large compared to the size of the body. It may also be done because only one palp is needed.

Females of the Yemeni species T. argo tear off the single remaining palp before feeding on males. The palp remains attached to the female's epigyne for about four hours, continuing to function despite being separated from the male's body.

== Life style ==
Their webs consist of a retreat and a scaffold of threads extending to the side of a wall, not or rarely reaching the ground. Web dimensions depend on the space available, in the field large female webs may measure up to half a metre in height. The retreat is a densely spun area into which prey remnants and other debris are incorporated. The adult males of Tidarren has only one palp, as a result of self-amputation. This is accomplished a few hours after the penultimate moult, when the male raises one palp and turns around in circles until the palp becomes caught in the threads at the moulting site. By further circling the palp becomes constricted and finally breaks off. During mating the male constructs a mating thread, which he plucks rhythmically until the female approaches. Copulation then takes place on the mating thread. Males generally die during mating. In T. cuneolatum the male is devoured after a few minutes of insertion.

== Description ==
Sexual size dimorphism pronounced. Females are medium-sized about 3 mm long, males are dwarfs with a total body length of approximately 1 mm. Adult males possess only one palp. Carapace longer than wide, without modifications; clypeus in male high, with eye region protruding; in female concave, with eye region recessed; eyes about equal in size; sternum sometimes with characteristic pattern. Abdomen higher than long, in many species with dorsal tubercle, sometimes with white lines on sides and a white aboral stripe from apex to spinnerets. Male stridulatory organ on posterior border of prosoma present, but inconspicuous. Leg formula 1423.

== Taxonomy ==
This genus was revised by Knoflach & Van Harten (2006). According to them the regular occurrence of this genus in Africa suggests more species might be listed under the large collective genus Theridion. Owing to their small size, males are under-represented in museum collections, hence many species comprise females only.

== Species ==
As of October 2025, this genus includes 24 species:

- Tidarren aethiops Knoflach & van Harten, 2006 – DR Congo
- Tidarren afrum Knoflach & van Harten, 2006 – Cameroon, Uganda
- Tidarren apartiolum Knoflach & van Harten, 2006 – Madagascar
- Tidarren argo Knoflach & van Harten, 2001 – Yemen, Chad
- Tidarren circe Knoflach & van Harten, 2006 – Namibia
- Tidarren cuneolatum (Tullgren, 1910) – Cape Verde, Canary Islands, Africa, Spain, Yemen. Introduced to Venezuela
- Tidarren dasyglossa Knoflach & van Harten, 2006 – Madagascar
- Tidarren dentigerum Knoflach & van Harten, 2006 – Yemen
- Tidarren ephemerum Knoflach & van Harten, 2006 – Madagascar
- Tidarren gracile Knoflach & van Harten, 2006 – Yemen
- Tidarren griswoldi Knoflach & van Harten, 2006 – Cameroon
- Tidarren haemorrhoidale (Bertkau, 1880) – USA to Argentina
- Tidarren horaki Knoflach & van Harten, 2006 – Madagascar
- Tidarren konrad Knoflach & van Harten, 2006 – Yemen
- Tidarren lanceolatum Knoflach & van Harten, 2006 – DR Congo
- Tidarren levii Schmidt, 1957 – DR Congo
- Tidarren mixtum (O. Pickard-Cambridge, 1896) – Mexico to Costa Rica
- Tidarren obtusum Knoflach & van Harten, 2006 – Madagascar
- Tidarren perplexum Knoflach & van Harten, 2006 – Cameroon, DR Congo
- Tidarren scenicum (Thorell, 1899) – Guinea-Bissau, Ivory Coast, Cameroon, South Africa, Eswatini
- Tidarren sheba Knoflach & van Harten, 2006 – Yemen
- Tidarren sisyphoides (Walckenaer, 1841) – USA to Argentina, Caribbean (type species)
- Tidarren ubickorum Knoflach & van Harten, 2006 – Zimbabwe, South Africa
- Tidarren usambara Knoflach & van Harten, 2006 – Tanzania
