= Tidarren argo =

Scientific classification
- Domain: Eukaryota
- Kingdom: Animalia
- Phylum: Arthropoda
- Subphylum: Chelicerata
- Class: Arachnida
- Order: Araneae
- Infraorder: Araneomorphae
- Family: Theridiidae
- Genus: Tidarren
- Species: T. argo

Binomial name
- Tidarren argo Knoflach & van Harten 2006

Species of spider

Tidarren argo is a spider from Yemen. The species is remarkable by its male amputating one of its palps before maturation and entering his adult life with one palp only. It adopts exceptional copulatory behaviour: when the male achieves genitalia coupling with his palp, the latter is torn off by the female. The separated gonopod remains attached to the female's epigynum for approximately 4 hours and continues to function independently, serving as a mating plug. While this happens, the female feeds on the male. Emasculation thus synchronizes sexual cannibalism and sperm transfer, lengthening the interval between copulations. This mating behaviour might allow for the continuation of insemination by the dismembered palp.
