= Tidarren haemorrhoidale =

Scientific classification
- Domain: Eukaryota
- Kingdom: Animalia
- Phylum: Arthropoda
- Subphylum: Chelicerata
- Class: Arachnida
- Order: Araneae
- Infraorder: Araneomorphae
- Family: Theridiidae
- Genus: Tidarren
- Species: T. haemorrhoidale

Binomial name
- Tidarren haemorrhoidale (Bertkau, 1880)

Species of spider

Tidarren haemorrhoidale is a species of spider in the family Theridiidae. It is found in a range from the United States to Argentina.
