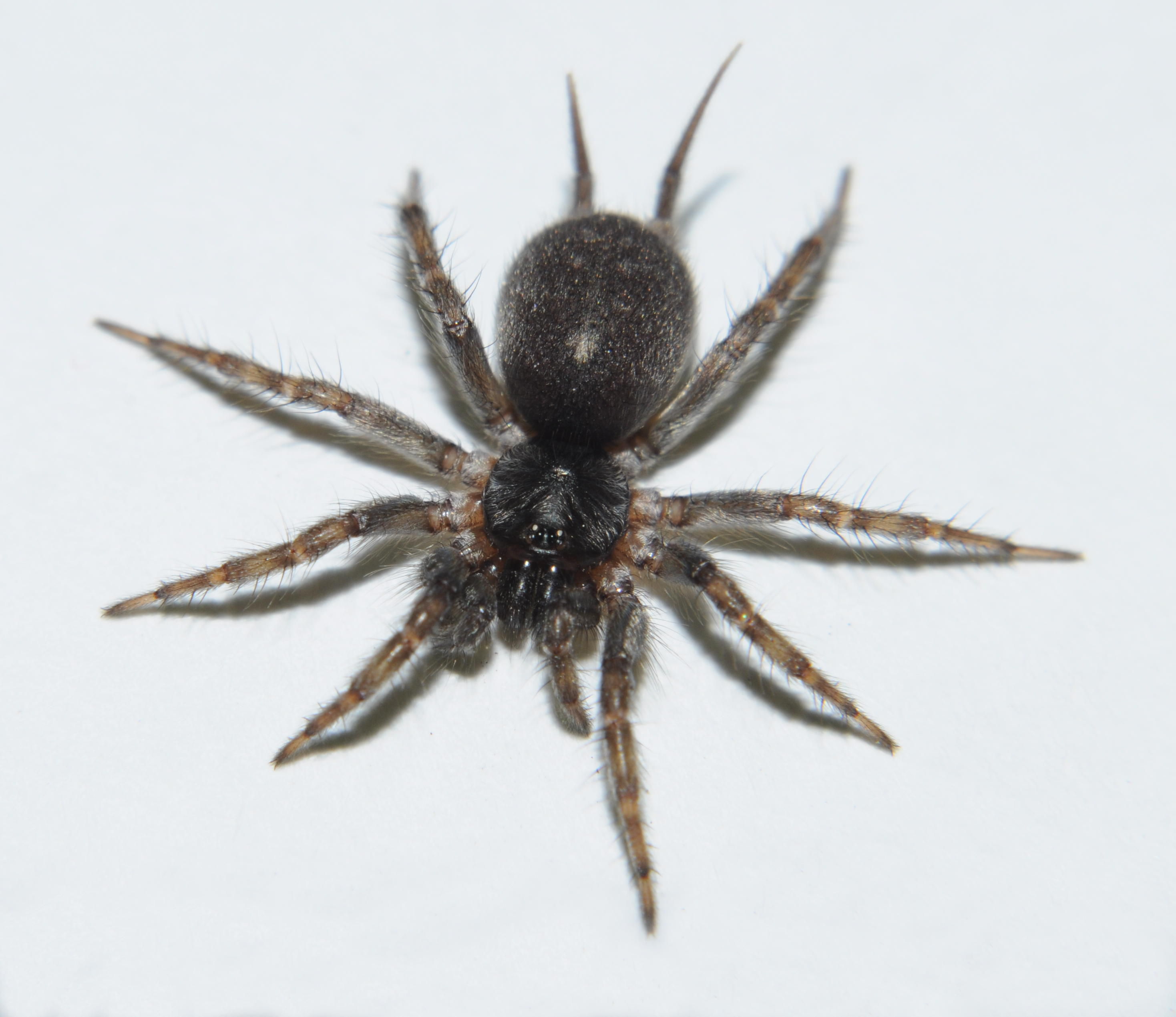

Scientific classification
- Kingdom: Animalia
- Phylum: Arthropoda
- Subphylum: Chelicerata
- Class: Arachnida
- Order: Araneae
- Infraorder: Mygalomorphae
- Family: Ischnothelidae
- Genus: Ischnothele
- Species: I. caudata

Binomial name
- Ischnothele caudata Ausserer, 1875

= Ischnothele caudata =

Species of spider

Ischnothele caudata is a spider in the family Ischnothelidae, found from Mexico to Brazil. It was first described in 1875 by Anton Ausserer. Ausserer did not explain the choice of specific name, but the Latin word caudatus means 'tailed'.
