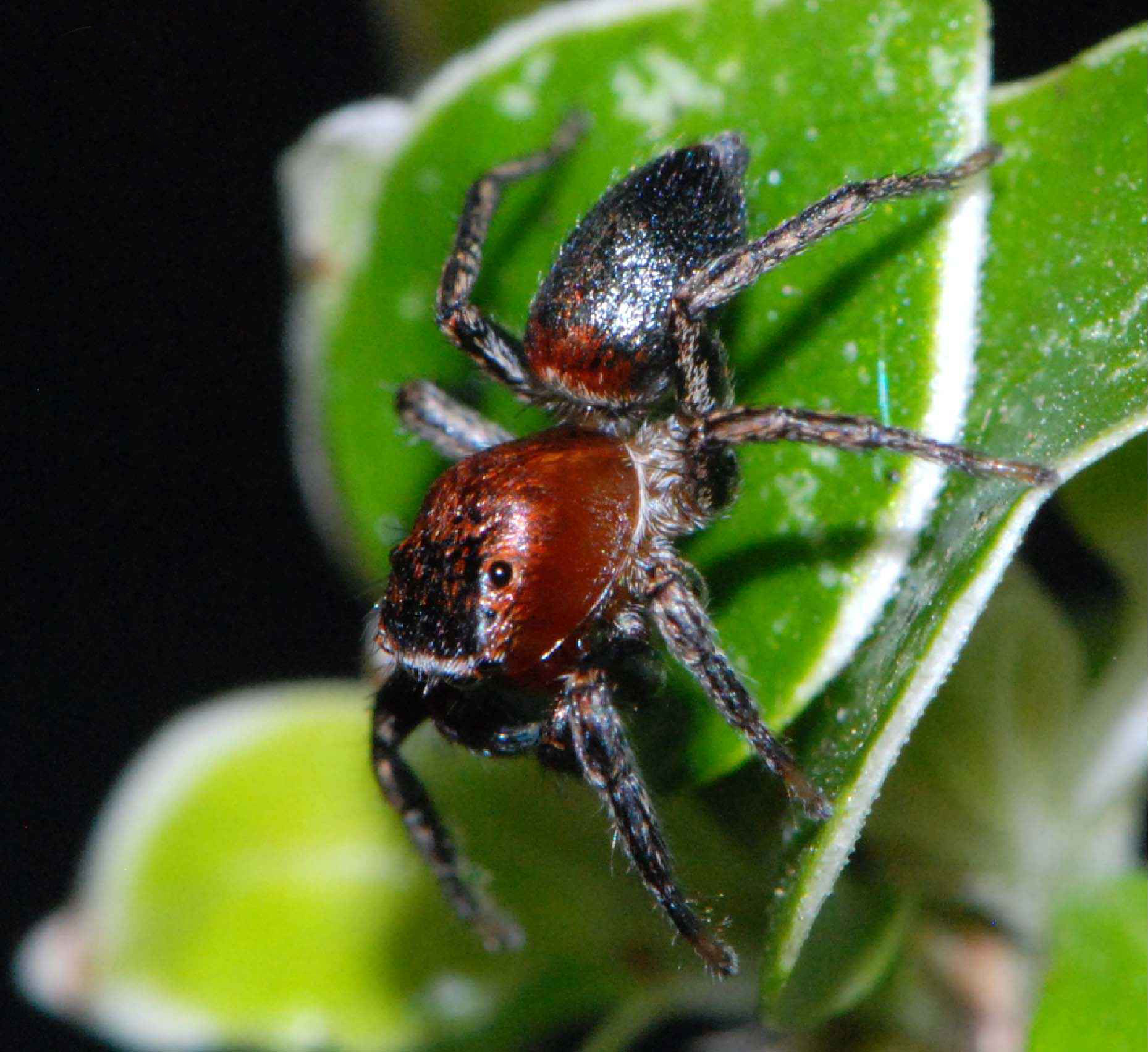
- Adult male Tullgrenella yungae in Misiones, Argentina

Scientific classification
- Kingdom: Animalia
- Phylum: Arthropoda
- Subphylum: Chelicerata
- Class: Arachnida
- Order: Araneae
- Infraorder: Araneomorphae
- Family: Salticidae
- Subfamily: Salticinae
- Genus: Tullgrenella; Mello-Leitão, 1941

Type species
- T. morenensis (Tullgren, 1905)

Species
- 13, see text

Synonyms
- Akeloides Mello-Leitão, 1944

= Tullgrenella =

Genus of spiders

Tullgrenella is a genus of South American jumping spiders that was first described by Cândido Firmino de Mello-Leitão in 1941. It is named after Swedish arachnologist Albert Tullgren, and is a senior synonym of Akeloides.

== Species ==
As of August 2019 it contains thirteen species, found in Uruguay, Chile, Argentina, Bolivia, and Brazil:

- Tullgrenella corrugata Galiano, 1981 – Brazil
- Tullgrenella didelphis (Simon, 1886) – Bolivia
- Tullgrenella gertschi Galiano, 1981 – Brazil
- Tullgrenella guayapae Galiano, 1970 – Argentina
- Tullgrenella lunata (Mello-Leitão, 1944) – Argentina
- Tullgrenella melanica (Mello-Leitão, 1941) – Argentina
- Tullgrenella morenensis (Tullgren, 1905) (type) – Argentina
- Tullgrenella musica (Mello-Leitão, 1945) – Argentina
- Tullgrenella peniaflorensis Galiano, 1970 – Chile
- Tullgrenella quadripunctata (Mello-Leitão, 1944) – Argentina, Uruguay
- Tullgrenella selenita Galiano, 1970 – Argentina
- Tullgrenella serrana Galiano, 1970 – Argentina
- Tullgrenella yungae Galiano, 1970 – Bolivia, Argentina
