= Notiohyphantes excelsus =

Scientific classification
- Domain: Eukaryota
- Kingdom: Animalia
- Phylum: Arthropoda
- Subphylum: Chelicerata
- Class: Arachnida
- Order: Araneae
- Infraorder: Araneomorphae
- Family: Linyphiidae
- Genus: Notiohyphantes
- Species: N. excelsus

Binomial name
- Notiohyphantes excelsus (Keyserling, 1886)

Synonyms
- Several, including: Frontina excelsa Keyserling, 1886; Notiohyphantes elegans (Keyserling, 1891)

Species of spider

Notiohyphantes excelsus is a species of spiders in the family Linyphiidae. It is found from Mexico to Peru, Brazil and on the Galapagos Islands.
