= Tidarren ubickorum =

Scientific classification
- Kingdom: Animalia
- Phylum: Arthropoda
- Subphylum: Chelicerata
- Class: Arachnida
- Order: Araneae
- Infraorder: Araneomorphae
- Family: Theridiidae
- Genus: Tidarren
- Species: T. ubickorum

Binomial name
- Tidarren ubickorum Knoflach & van Harten, 2006

Species of spider

Tidarren ubickorum is a species of spider in the family Theridiidae. It is found in Zimbabwe and South Africa.

== Distribution ==
Tidarren ubickorum is found in Zimbabwe and South Africa. In South Africa it is known from Mpumalanga at Songimvelo Nature Reserve.

== Habitat and ecology ==
In South Africa, it has been sampled from vegetation in the Grassland biome and also from suburban gardens at 1109 m altitude.

== Description ==
Tidarren ubickorum is the only Tidarren species from mainland Africa hitherto known which has a rounded abdomen. Its epigynal protuberance is slender in side view and rather small. The male is unknown.

== Conservation ==
Tidarren ubickorum is listed as Data Deficient for taxonomic reasons by the South African National Biodiversity Institute. The species is known from only one locality in South Africa with a very small range. More sampling is needed to collect the male and determine the species range.

== Etymology ==
The species is named after US arachnologist Darrell Ubick.

== Taxonomy ==
Tidarren ubickorum was described by Knoflach & Van Harten in 2006 from Songimvelo Nature Reserve in Mpumalanga. The species is known only from the female.
