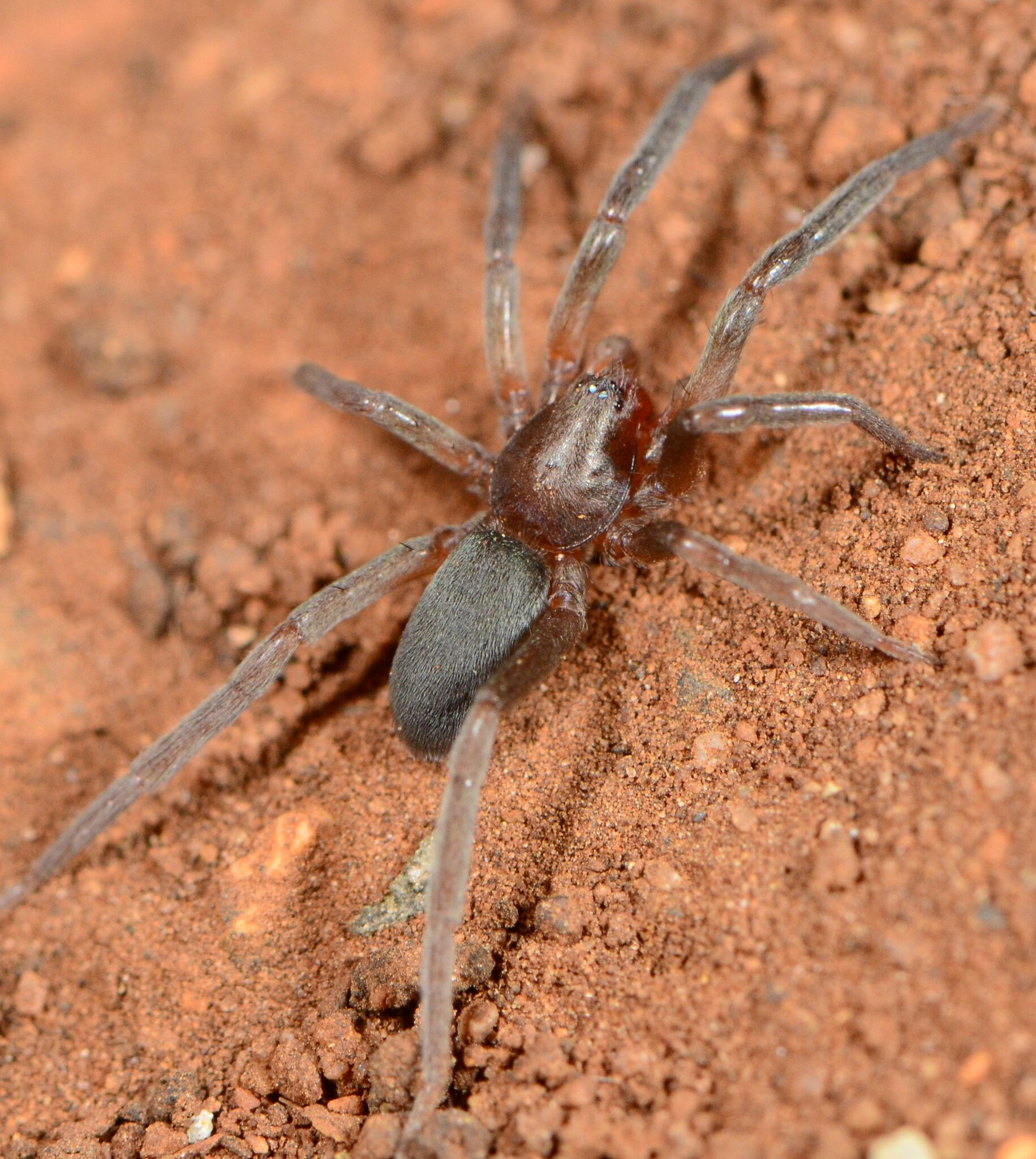
- female

Scientific classification
- Kingdom: Animalia
- Phylum: Arthropoda
- Subphylum: Chelicerata
- Class: Arachnida
- Order: Araneae
- Infraorder: Araneomorphae
- Family: Gnaphosidae
- Genus: Amusia
- Species: A. cataracta

Binomial name
- Amusia cataracta Tucker, 1923

= Amusia cataracta =

Amusia Flat-Bellied Ground Spider

Species of spider

Amusia cataracta is a species of spider in the family Gnaphosidae. It is endemic to southern Africa.

== Distribution ==
Amusia cataracta is distributed is found in South Africa and Botswana. In South Africa, the species has been recorded from Free State, KwaZulu-Natal, and Western Cape.

== Habitat and ecology ==
The species inhabits multiple biomes including Grassland, Savanna, and Thicket biomes at altitudes ranging from 50 to 2,329 m above sea level. It is a free-living ground dwelling spider that has been collected from various habitats within these biomes.

== Description ==
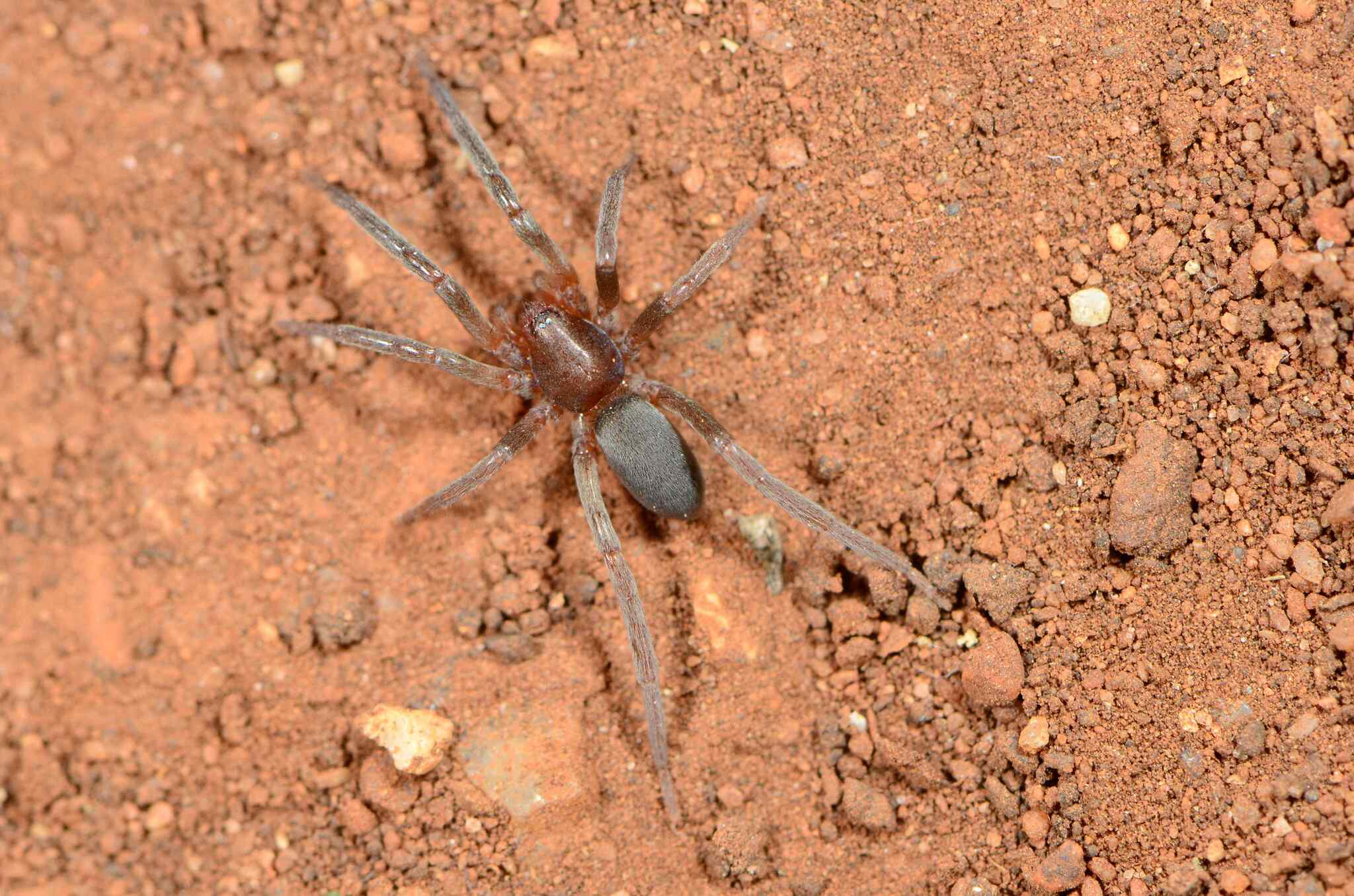
female

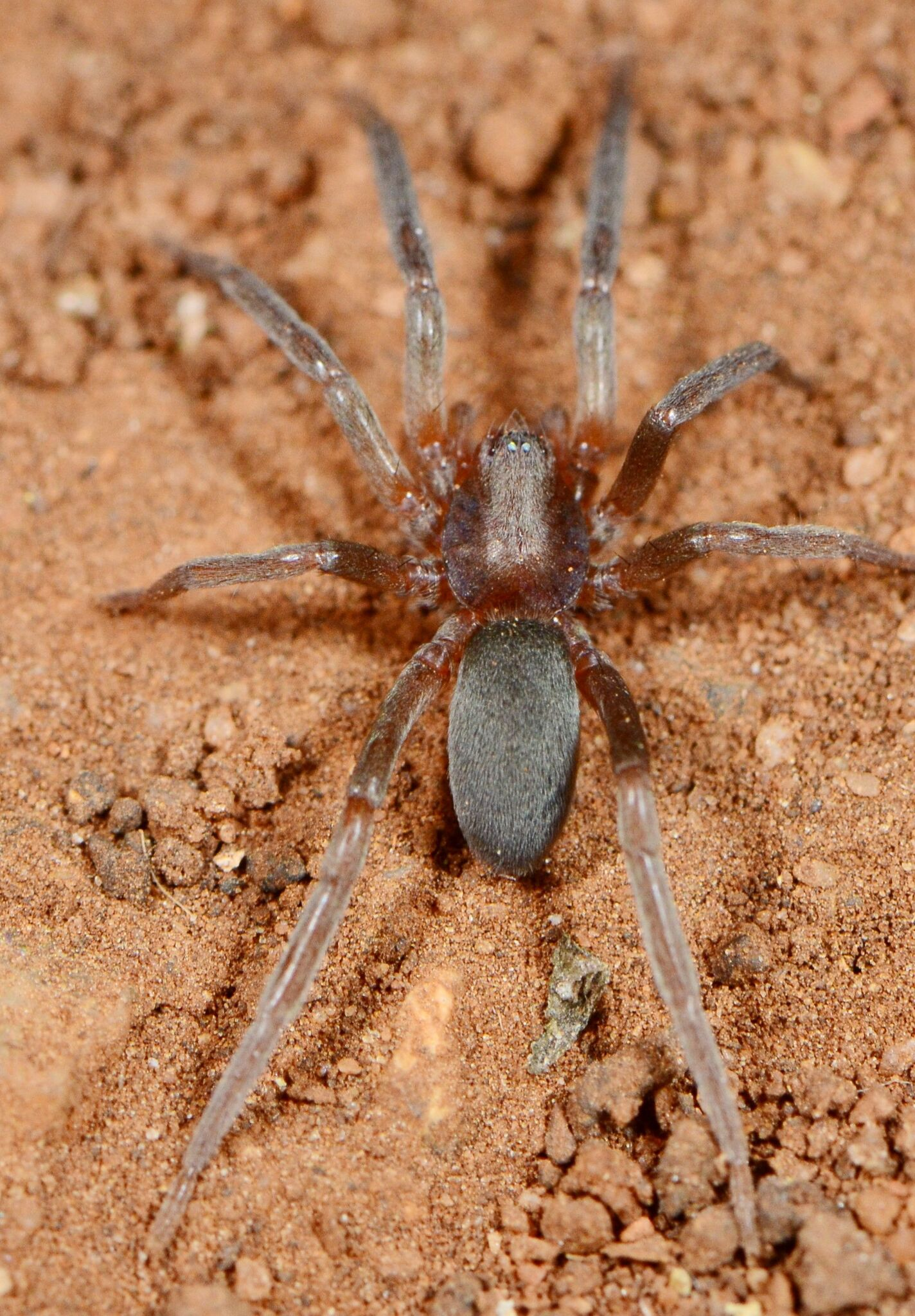
female

One of the diagnostic characters of the species is that metatarsi I are considerably shorter than tarsi I.

== Conservation ==
Amusia cataracta is listed as Least Concern by the South African National Biodiversity Institute due to its wide geographical range. The species is protected in several protected areas including Ophathe Game Reserve, Platberg Nature Reserve, Kogelberg Biosphere Reserve, and Swartberg Nature Reserve.

== Taxonomy ==
The species was originally described by R.W.E. Tucker in 1923 from specimens collected at Howick Falls in KwaZulu-Natal.
