= Tidarren scenicum =

Scientific classification
- Kingdom: Animalia
- Phylum: Arthropoda
- Subphylum: Chelicerata
- Class: Arachnida
- Order: Araneae
- Infraorder: Araneomorphae
- Family: Theridiidae
- Genus: Tidarren
- Species: T. scenicum

Binomial name
- Tidarren scenicum (Thorell, 1899)

Synonyms
- Theridion scenicum Thorell, 1899; Theridion turrigerum Simon, 1900; Theridion guineense Simon, 1907

Species of spider

Tidarren scenicum is a species of spider in the family Theridiidae. It is found in Guinea-Bissau, Ivory Coast, Cameroon, South Africa, and Eswatini.

== Distribution ==
Tidarren scenicum is found in Guinea-Bissau, Ivory Coast, Cameroon, South Africa, and Eswatini. In South Africa it is known from the Eastern Cape, Gauteng, KwaZulu-Natal, Limpopo, and Mpumalanga.

== Habitat and ecology ==
In South Africa, this species has been sampled from vegetation in Grassland and Savanna biomes at altitudes ranging from 613 to 1774 m.

== Description ==
Tidarren scenicum is the largest Tidarren species in the Old World, with a carapace width of 1.4 to 1.6 mm. The abdomen ends in a high tubercle. The male is unknown.

== Conservation ==
Tidarren scenicum is listed as Least Concern by the South African National Biodiversity Institute due to its large geographic range. It is protected in the Royal Natal National Park, Lekgalameetse Nature Reserve and Tsitsikamma National Park.

== Taxonomy ==
Tidarren scenicum was originally described by Tamerlan Thorell in 1899 as Theridion scenicum from Cameroon. It was revised by Knoflach & Van Harten in 2006, who synonymized Theridion turrigerum and T. guineense with this species. It is known only from the female.
