= Berlese funnel =

Device for collecting insects

A funnel (E) contains a sample of soil or leaf litter (D), and a heat source (F), in this case an electric lamp (G), heats the sample. Animals escaping from the desiccation of the sample descend through a filter (C) into a preservative liquid (A) in a receptacle (B). This illustration is merely a schematic, since usually the soil sample will not be crumbled and poured into the funnel (this would inevitably lead to a high amount of soil particles in the preservation fluid requiring laborious work to sort out the soil organisms). In fact, the soil sample is placed on a mesh sieve that will allow the soil animals to pass but should retain most of the soil particles.

A Berlese funnel or Berlese trap is a device used to extract desiccation-intolerant invertebrates from samples of soil or leaf litter. It works by creating a desiccation gradient over the sample such that mobile organisms will move away from the dry environment and fall into a collecting vessel, where they are preserved for examination.

Biologist Antonio Berlese first described such a device in 1905, using a hot water jacket as heat source. In 1918 Albert Tullgren described a modification, where the heating came from above by an electric bulb and the heat gradient was increased by an iron sheet drum around the soil sample. For this reason the term Tullgren funnel is also used. A modern funnel usually combines elements from both methods and thus may be referred to as a Berlese-Tullgren funnel.

Another variation uses naphthalene flakes or similar aromatic mothballs in place of a heat source to drive organisms downward. This method finds application in situations without electrical power, where the organisms are repulsed by volatile preservatives in collection container, or they cannot migrate downward quickly enough to avoid succumbing to desiccation.

== See also ==
- Insect collecting
- Soil biology
