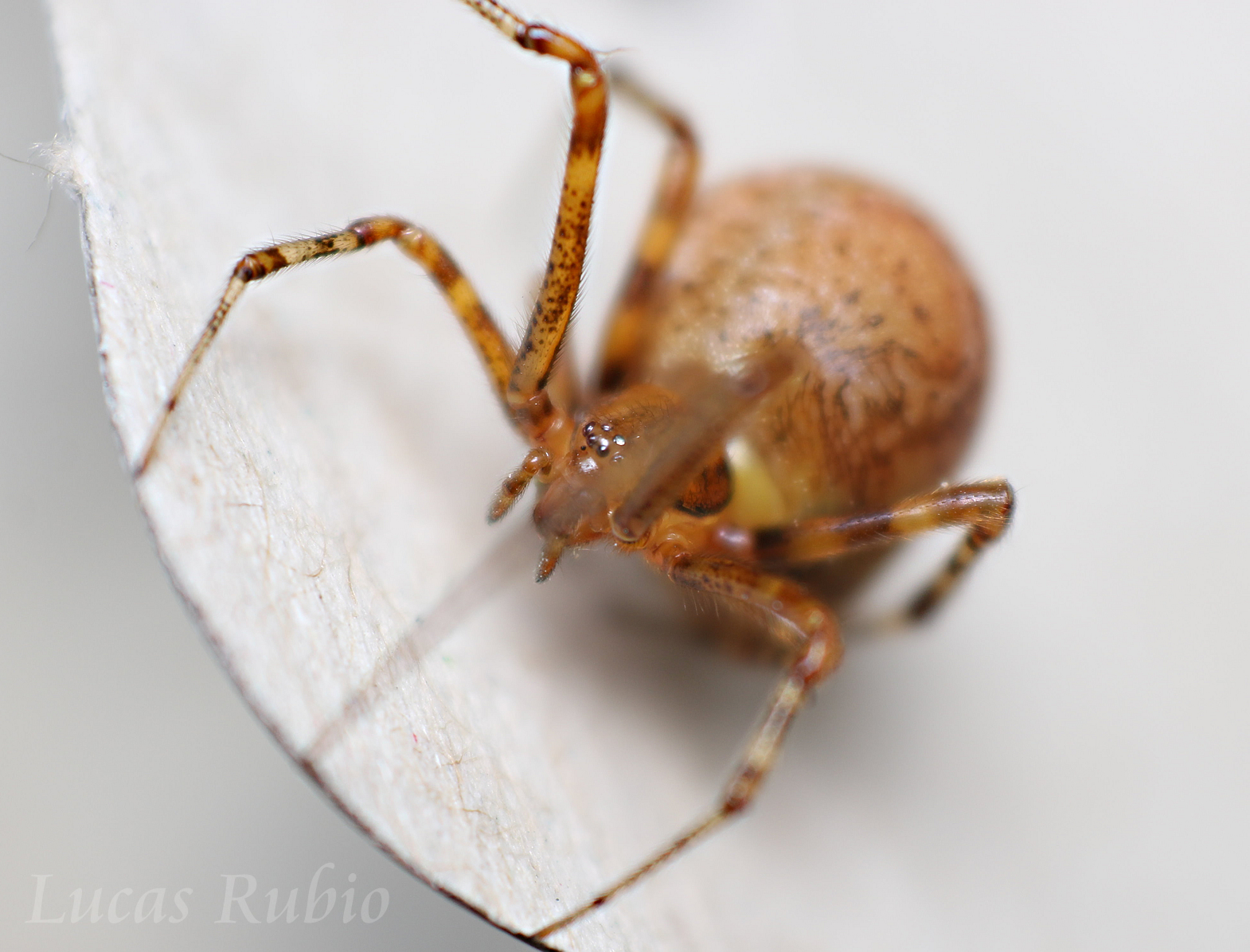

Scientific classification
- Kingdom: Animalia
- Phylum: Arthropoda
- Subphylum: Chelicerata
- Class: Arachnida
- Order: Araneae
- Infraorder: Araneomorphae
- Family: Theridiidae
- Genus: Tidarren
- Species: T. sisyphoides

Binomial name
- Tidarren sisyphoides Walckenaer, 1842

= Tidarren sisyphoides =

Species of spider

Tidarren sisyphoides is a species of spider in the family Theridiidae - the tangle web spiders.

The male of this species is only ~10% the size of the female. At copulation, the male dies during insertion and remains attached to the female for more than two hours. However, the female does not eat her mate. The dead male is afterwards removed from the web.

== Prey hunting ==
Tiddarren sisyphoides can attach viscous threads to prey caught in its web. Once they capture their prey, they move it to their retreat, where they wrap it further and add more thread.

=== Spider web construction ===
There are several steps involved in building a web by Tiddarren sisyphoides. It consists of the scaffolding, doming, and web-filling stages that support the rest of the web and the upper tangle. The dome-shaped sheet and upper tangle comprise a functional trap for hunting spider webs. On the other hand, horizontal sheets play only a weak role in prey capture. The horizontal dome does not begin until the sheet is partially completed and is characterized by being relatively less dense than the dome shape. Additionally, viscous balls existed to ensure smooth hunting. It is hydrophilic and increases in size as it gets wet.

== Reproduction ==
In this species, mating involves the male's reproductive organs remaining attached to the female's chromophore for an average of 2.4 hours. Additionally, deaths have been known to occur during (insert). Female spiders of Tiddarren sisyphoides do not eat their mates after mating.

Tiddarren sisyphoides female spiders reject multiple copulations. After mating, she pulled off another male who had climbed over her.

Females of produce clutches containing approximately 238 eggs. Each egg measures about 0.66 mm in diameter and weighs around 0.16 mg. The average female body mass is about 51.8 mg.

== Etymology ==
From Sisyphos, a king in Greek mythology.

== Distribution ==
Tidarren sisyphoides occurs from the southern United States to Colombia and on the West Indies.
