= Typhochrestus digitatus =

Scientific classification
- Domain: Eukaryota
- Kingdom: Animalia
- Phylum: Arthropoda
- Subphylum: Chelicerata
- Class: Arachnida
- Order: Araneae
- Infraorder: Araneomorphae
- Family: Linyphiidae
- Genus: Typhochrestus
- Species: T. digitatus

Binomial name
- Typhochrestus digitatus (O.Pickard-Cambridge, 1873)

Species of spider

Typhochrestus digitatus is a species of spiders belonging to the family Linyphiidae.

It is native to Europe.
