= Albert Tullgren =

Swedish entomologist

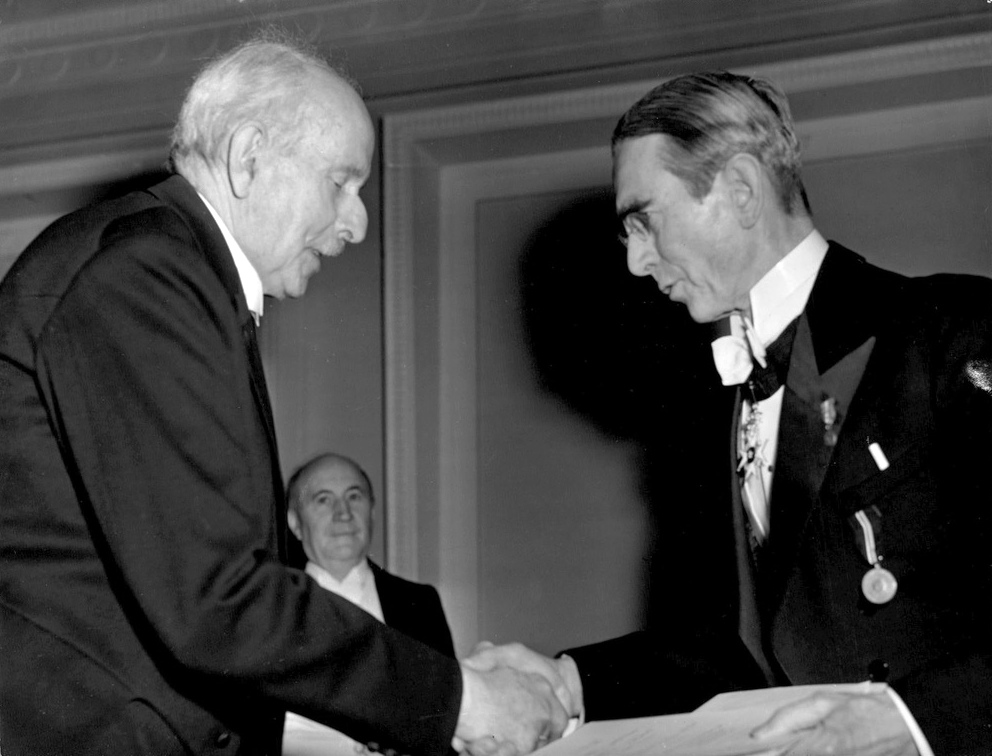
Albert Tullgren (left) and Gerhard Lindblom

Hugo Albert Tullgren (7 September 1874, in Stockholm – 1 July 1958) was a Swedish entomologist and arachnologist. The eponymous "Tullgren funnel" is a modified Berlese funnel, a device used to extract small insects and arthropods from soil samples.

Tullgren received his bachelor's degree from Uppsala University in 1899, and from 1902 worked as an assistant at the National Entomological Institute. From 1907 he was associated with the entomology department of the Centralanstalten för försöksväsendet på jordbruksområdet (Central Institute for Experimental Agriculture), of which, he became a professor in 1913. He received an honorary doctorate from Uppsala in 1932. He published on Swedish insects (1920) working along with Einar Wahlgren (1874–1963). He also wrote books on insects of gardens and those of importance to agriculture.

The jumping spider genus Tullgrenella was named in his honor by Cândido Firmino de Mello-Leitão.

== Selected works ==
- "On the spiders collected in Florida by Dr. Einar Lönnberg, 1892-93" (in English, 1901).
- "Spiders collected in the Aysen Valley in South-Chile by P. Dusén" (in English, 1902).
- "On some species of the genus Scolia (s.1.) from the East-Indies collected by Carl Aurivillius" (in English, 1904).
- Einge Chelonethiden aus Java, 1905 – Chelonethida from Java.
- "Aranedia from the Swedish expedition through the Gran Chaco and the Cordilleras" (in English, 1905).
- Zur kenntnis schwedischer coniopterygiden, 1906 – On Coniopterygidae.
- Zur Kenntnis aussereuropäischer Chelonethiden des Natürhistorischen Museums in Hamburg, 1907 – Non-European Chelonethida at the Natural History Museum in Hamburg.
- Skadeinsekter i trädgården och på fältet, en kortfattad handbok för trädgårdsodlare och landtmän, 1908 – Insect pests in the garden and field.
- Aphidologische studien, 1909 – Aphidology studies.
- Trädgårdsväxternas fiender och vänner bland de lägre djuren, 1915.
- Vȧra insekter sȧsom sjukdomsspridare; pȧ uppdrag av Kungl. Medicinalstyrelsen, 1918.
- Apelmärgmalen (Blastodacna putripennella Hell) : ett i vårt land föga beaktat, men tvivelsutan viktigt skadedjur, 1918.
- Svenska insekter, en orienterande handbok vid studiet av vårt lands insektfauna, 1920. – Swedish insects, an introductory guide to the study of our country's insect fauna.
- Svenska fjärilar : systematisk bearbetning av sveriges storfjärilar, Macrolepidoptera (with Frithiof Nordström and Einar Wahlgren, 1934) – Swedish butterflies; systematic processing of Sweden's large butterflies, Macrolepidoptera.
- Svensk spindelfauna. 3. Egentliga spindlar. Araneae. Fam. 1-4. Salticidae, Thomisidae, Philodromidae, och Eusparrassidae, 1944 – Swedish spider fauna. 3. Southwest spiders. Araneae. Families 1–4. Salticidae, Thomisidae, Philodromidae, and Eusparrassidae.
- Våra spindlar och hur man känner igen dem; illustrerad handbok, 1949 – Sweden's spiders and how to recognize them; illustrated guide.

Tullgren edited the exsiccata-like series Islas Canaries 1896: Musci.
