= List of Mysmenidae species =

This page lists all described species of the spider family Mysmenidae accepted by the World Spider Catalog as of February 2021:

== B ==
=== Brasilionata ===
Brasilionata Wunderlich, 1995

- B. arborense Wunderlich, 1995 (type) — Brazil

== C ==
=== Chanea ===
Chanea Miller, Griswold & Yin, 2009

- C. suukyii Miller, Griswold & Yin, 2009 (type) — China
- C. voluta Lin & Li, 2016 — China

== D ==
=== † Dominicanopsis ===
† Dominicanopsis Wunderlich, 2004

- † D. grimaldii Wunderlich, 2004

== E ==
=== † Eomysmenopsis ===
† Eomysmenopsis Wunderlich, 2004

- † E. spinipes Wunderlich, 2004

== G ==
=== Gaoligonga ===
Gaoligonga Miller, Griswold & Yin, 2009

- G. changya Miller, Griswold & Yin, 2009 (type) — China
- G. taeniata Lin & Li, 2014 — Vietnam
- G. zhusun Miller, Griswold & Yin, 2009 — China

== I ==
=== Isela ===
Isela Griswold, 1985

- I. inquilina (Baert & Murphy, 1987) — Kenya
- I. okuncana Griswold, 1985 (type) — South Africa

== M ==
=== Maymena ===
Maymena Gertsch, 1960

- M. ambita (Barrows, 1940) — USA
- M. calcarata (Simon, 1898) — St. Vincent
- M. cascada Gertsch, 1971 — Mexico
- M. chica Gertsch, 1960 — Mexico
- M. delicata Gertsch, 1971 — Mexico
- M. grisea Gertsch, 1971 — Mexico
- M. mayana (Chamberlin & Ivie, 1938) (type) — Mexico, Guatemala
- M. misteca Gertsch, 1960 — Mexico
- M. rica Platnick, 1993 — Costa Rica
- M. roca Baert, 1990 — Peru
- M. sbordonii Brignoli, 1974 — Mexico

=== Microdipoena ===
Microdipoena Banks, 1895

- M. comorensis (Baert, 1986) — Comoros
- M. elsae Saaristo, 1978 — Seychelles, Congo, Comoros
- M. gongi (Yin, Peng & Bao, 2004) — China
- M. guttata Banks, 1895 (type) — USA to Paraguay
- M. illectrix (Simon, 1895) — Philippines
- M. jobi (Kraus, 1967) — Europe, Caucasus, Iran, China, Korea, Japan
- M. menglunensis (Lin & Li, 2008) — China
- M. mihindi (Baert, 1989) — Rwanda
- M. nyungwe Baert, 1989 — Rwanda, Tanzania, Madagascar
- M. ogatai (Ono, 2007) — Japan
- M. papuana (Baert, 1984) — New Guinea
- M. pseudojobi (Lin & Li, 2008) — China, Japan
- M. saltuensis (Simon, 1895) — Sri Lanka
- M. samoensis (Marples, 1955) — Samoa, Hawaii
- M. vanstallei Baert, 1985 — Cameroon
- M. yinae (Lin & Li, 2013) — China

=== Mosu ===
Mosu Miller, Griswold & Yin, 2009

- M. dayan Lin & Li, 2013 — China
- M. huogou Miller, Griswold & Yin, 2009 — China
- M. nujiang Miller, Griswold & Yin, 2009 (type) — China
- M. tanjia Lin & Li, 2013 — China

=== Mysmena ===
Mysmena

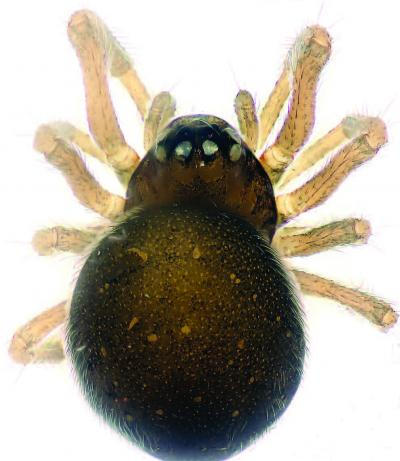
Mysmena wawuensis, female

Mysmena Simon, 1894

- M. acuminata (Marples, 1955) — Samoa
- M. arcilonga Lin & Li, 2008 — China
- M. awari (Baert, 1984) — New Guinea
- M. baoxingensis Lin & Li, 2013 — China
- M. biangulata (Lin & Li, 2008) — China
- M. bizi Miller, Griswold & Yin, 2009 — China
- M. calypso Gertsch, 1960 — Trinidad
- M. caribbaea (Gertsch, 1960) — Jamaica, Trinidad
- M. changouzi Miller, Griswold & Yin, 2009 — China
- M. colima (Gertsch, 1960) — Mexico
- M. conica (Simon, 1895) — Algeria
- M. cornigera (Lin & Li, 2008) — China
- M. dumoga (Baert, 1988) — Indonesia (Sulawesi)
- M. furca Lin & Li, 2008 — China
- M. gibbosa Snazell, 1986 — Spain
- M. goudao Miller, Griswold & Yin, 2009 — China
- M. guianensis Levi, 1956 — Guyana
- M. haban Miller, Griswold & Yin, 2009 — China
- M. incredula (Gertsch & Davis, 1936) — USA, Mexico, Bahama Is., Cuba, Panama
- M. isolata Forster, 1977 — St. Helena
- M. jinlong Miller, Griswold & Yin, 2009 — China
- M. leichhardti Lopardo & Michalik, 2013 — Australia (Queensland)
- M. leucoplagiata (Simon, 1880) (type) — Southern Europe to Azerbaijan, Israel
- M. lulanga Lin & Li, 2016 — China
- M. maculosa Lin & Li, 2014 — Vietnam
- M. marijkeae (Baert, 1982) — New Guinea
- M. marplesi (Brignoli, 1980) — New Caledonia
- M. mooatae (Baert, 1988) — Indonesia (Sulawesi)
- M. nubiai (Baert, 1984) — New Guinea
- M. phyllicola (Marples, 1955) — Samoa, Niue
- M. quebecana Lopardo & Dupérré, 2008 — Canada
- M. rostella Lin & Li, 2008 — China
- M. rotunda (Marples, 1955) — Samoa
- M. santacruzi (Baert & Maelfait, 1983) — Ecuador (Galapagos Is.)
- M. shibali Miller, Griswold & Yin, 2009 — China
- M. spirala Lin & Li, 2008 — China
- M. stathamae (Gertsch, 1960) — Mexico, Panama, Jamaica
- M. taiwanica Ono, 2007 — Taiwan
- M. tamdaoensis (Lin & Li, 2014) — Vietnam
- M. tarautensis (Baert, 1988) — Indonesia (Sulawesi)
- M. tasmaniae Hickman, 1979 — Australia (Tasmania)
- M. tembei (Baert, 1984) — Paraguay
- M. vangoethemi (Baert, 1982) — New Guinea
- M. vitiensis Forster, 1959 — Fiji
- M. wawuensis Lin & Li, 2013 — China
- M. woodwardi Forster, 1959 — New Guinea
- M. zhengi Lin & Li, 2008 — China
- † M. copalis Wunderlich, 2011
- † M. curvata Wunderlich, 2011
- † M. dominicana Wunderlich, 1998
- † M. fossilis Petrunkevitch, 1971
- † M. groehni Wunderlich, 2004
- † M. grotae Wunderlich, 2004

=== Mysmeniola ===
Mysmeniola Thaler, 1995

- M. spinifera Thaler, 1995 (type) — Venezuela

=== Mysmenopsis ===
Mysmenopsis Simon, 1898

- M. alvaroi Dupérré & Tapia, 2020 — Ecuador
- M. amazonica Dupérré & Tapia, 2020 — Ecuador
- M. angamarca Dupérré & Tapia, 2020 — Ecuador
- M. archeri Platnick & Shadab, 1978 — Brazil
- M. atahualpa Baert, 1990 — Peru, Ecuador
- M. awa Dupérré & Tapia, 2020 — Ecuador
- M. baerti Dupérré & Tapia, 2020 — Ecuador
- M. bartolozzii Dupérré & Tapia, 2020 — Ecuador
- M. beebei (Gertsch, 1960) — Trinidad
- M. capac Baert, 1990 — Peru
- M. chiquita Dupérré & Tapia, 2015 — Ecuador
- M. choco Dupérré & Tapia, 2020 — Ecuador
- M. cidrelicola (Simon, 1895) — Venezuela
- M. cienaga Müller, 1987 — Colombia, Peru
- M. corazon Dupérré & Tapia, 2020 — Ecuador
- M. cube Dupérré & Tapia, 2020 — Ecuador
- M. cymbia (Levi, 1956) — USA
- M. dipluramigo Platnick & Shadab, 1978 — Panama, Colombia
- M. femoralis Simon, 1898 (type) — St. Vincent
- M. fernandoi Dupérré & Tapia, 2015 — Ecuador
- M. funebris Simon, 1898 — St. Vincent
- M. furtiva Coyle & Meigs, 1989 — Jamaica
- M. gamboa Platnick & Shadab, 1978 — Panama
- M. guanza Dupérré & Tapia, 2020 — Ecuador
- M. guayaca Dupérré & Tapia, 2020 — Ecuador
- M. huascar Baert, 1990 — Peru
- M. hunachi Dupérré & Tapia, 2020 — Ecuador
- M. ischnamigo Platnick & Shadab, 1978 — Panama, Trinidad, Peru
- M. ixlitla (Levi, 1956) — Mexico
- M. junin Dupérré & Tapia, 2020 — Ecuador
- M. kochalkai Platnick & Shadab, 1978 — Colombia
- M. lasrocas Dupérré & Tapia, 2020 — Ecuador
- M. lloa Dupérré & Tapia, 2020 — Ecuador
- M. mexcala Gertsch, 1960 — Mexico
- M. monticola Coyle & Meigs, 1989 — Jamaica
- M. onorei Dupérré & Tapia, 2015 — Ecuador
- M. otokiki Dupérré & Tapia, 2020 — Ecuador
- M. otonga Dupérré & Tapia, 2015 — Ecuador
- M. pachacutec Baert, 1990 — Peru
- M. palpalis (Kraus, 1955) — Mexico, Guatemala, Honduras
- M. penai Platnick & Shadab, 1978 — Ecuador, Colombia
- M. pululahua Dupérré & Tapia, 2020 — Ecuador
- M. salazarae Dupérré & Tapia, 2020 — Ecuador
- M. schlingeri Platnick & Shadab, 1978 — Peru
- M. shushufindi Dupérré & Tapia, 2020 — Ecuador
- M. tengellacompa Platnick, 1993 — Costa Rica
- M. tepuy Dupérré & Tapia, 2020 — Ecuador
- M. tibialis (Bryant, 1940) — Cuba
- M. tungurahua Dupérré & Tapia, 2020 — Ecuador
- M. viracocha Baert, 1990 — Peru
- M. wygodzinskyi Platnick & Shadab, 1978 — Peru
- M. yupanqui Baert, 1990 — Peru
- † M. lissycoleyae Penney, 2000

== P ==
=== † Palaeomysmena ===
† Palaeomysmena Wunderlich, 2004

- † P. hoffeinsorum Wunderlich, 2004

=== Phricotelus ===
Phricotelus Simon, 1895

- P. stelliger Simon, 1895 (type) — Sri Lanka

== S ==
=== Simaoa ===
Simaoa Miller, Griswold & Yin, 2009

- S. bianjing Miller, Griswold & Yin, 2009 — China
- S. kavanaugh Miller, Griswold & Yin, 2009 — China
- S. maku Miller, Griswold & Yin, 2009 — China
- S. yaojia Miller, Griswold & Yin, 2009 (type) — China

== T ==
=== Trogloneta ===
Trogloneta Simon, 1922

- T. canariensis Wunderlich, 1987 — Canary Is.
- T. cantareira Brescovit & Lopardo, 2008 — Brazil
- T. cariacica Brescovit & Lopardo, 2008 — Brazil
- T. granulum Simon, 1922 (type) — Europe
- T. madeirensis Wunderlich, 1987 — Madeira
- T. mourai Brescovit & Lopardo, 2008 — Brazil
- T. nojimai (Ono, 2010) — Japan
- T. paradoxa Gertsch, 1960 — USA
- T. speciosum Lin & Li, 2008 — China
- T. uncata Lin & Li, 2013 — China
- T. yuensis Lin & Li, 2013 — China
- T. yunnanense (Song & Zhu, 1994) — China

== Y ==
=== Yamaneta ===
Yamaneta Miller & Lin, 2019

- Y. kehen (Miller, Griswold & Yin, 2009) — China
- Y. paquini (Miller, Griswold & Yin, 2009) (type) — China
