= Kleptoparasitism =

Type of animal feeding strategy

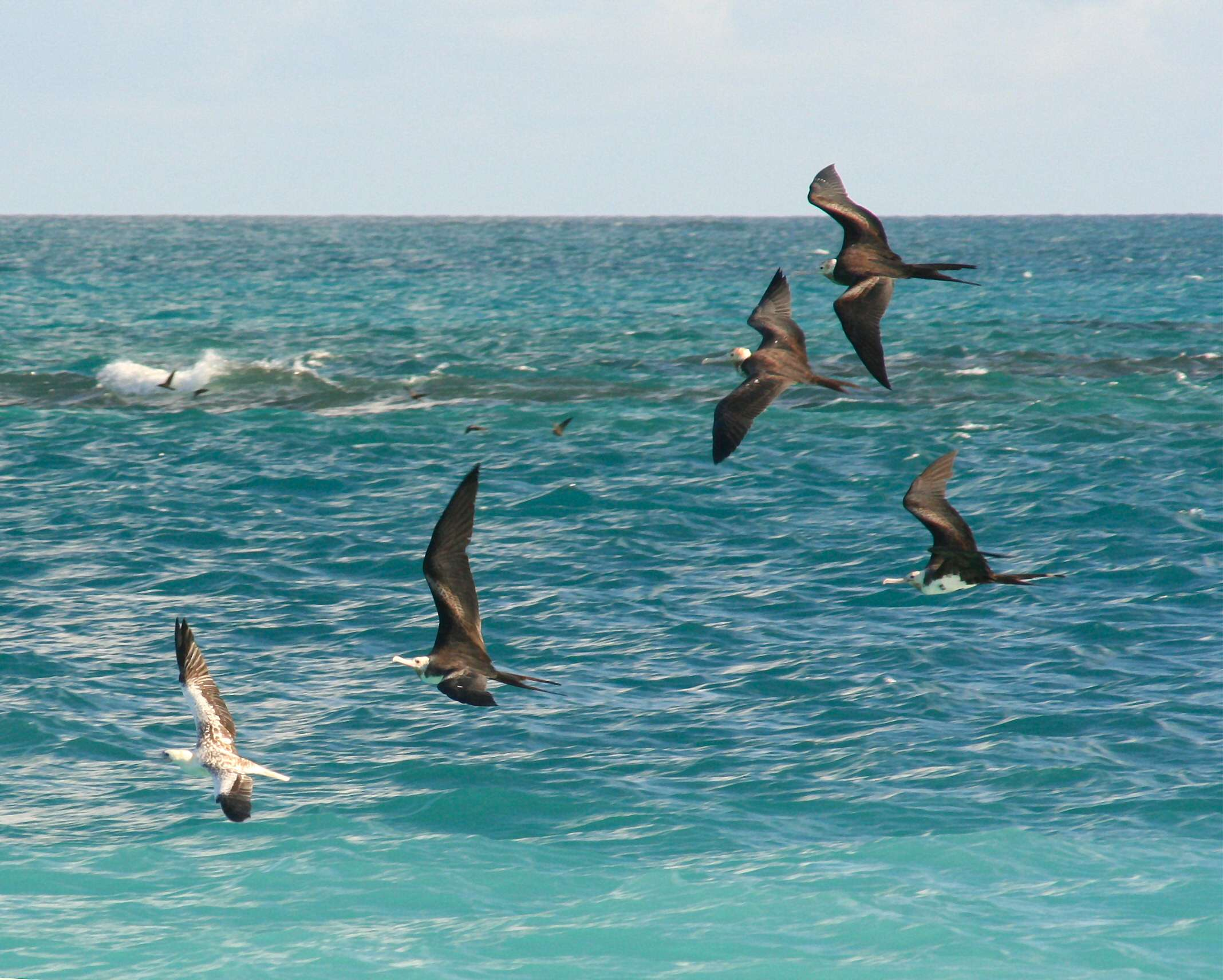
Great frigatebirds (Fregata minor) chasing a red-footed booby (Sula sula) to steal its food

Kleptoparasitism (originally spelled clepto-parasitism, meaning "parasitism by theft") is a form of feeding behavior in which one animal — i.e. the kleptoparasite — deliberately takes food from another animal, often via aggressive confrontations. The strategy is evolutionarily stable when stealing is less costly than direct predation, such as when food is scarce or when physically weaker/less assertive victims are abundant and unlikely to fight back.

Many kleptoparasites are arthropods, especially bees and wasps, but including some true flies, dung beetles, bugs and spiders. Cuckoo bees are specialized kleptoparasites which lay their eggs either on the pollen masses made by other bees, or on the insect hosts of parasitoid wasps. They are an instance of Emery's rule, which states that insect social parasites tend to be closely related to their hosts. The behavior also occurs among vertebrates including birds such as skuas, who persistently chase and harass other seabirds until they disgorge their food; and hypercarnivorous mammals such as spotted hyenas and lions, who routinely rob killed prey from each other and other mesopredators such as cheetahs. Other species might also opportunistically indulge in kleptoparasitism, especially when driven by the desperation of hunger and when scavenging isn't an option.

== Strategy ==
Kleptoparasitism is a feeding strategy where one animal deliberately steals food from another. This may be intraspecific, involving stealing from members of the same species, or interspecific, from members of other species. The term denotes a form of parasitism involving theft, from Greek κλέπτω (kléptō, 'steal'). The strategy has been widely studied in birds; in four families, all seabirds, the Fregatidae, Chionididae, Stercoraridae, and Laridae, it occurs in more than a quarter of the species.

Such a strategy should be followed only if it is evolutionarily stable, meaning that it offers a selective advantage to individuals that practise it. Kleptoparasitism costs time and energy which could otherwise be spent directly on feeding, so this cost must be outweighed by the benefit in energy gained from the stolen food. Mathematical modelling suggests that when food is abundant, ordinary feeding is the best strategy; when food abundance falls below a critical level, kleptoparasitism suddenly becomes advantageous, and aggressive interactions become common. Similarly, when potential victims are rare or widely dispersed, the time needed to find them may not be justified by the food that might be stolen from them, resulting in frequency-dependent selection.

== Taxonomic distribution ==
=== Arthropods ===
==== Bees and wasps ====
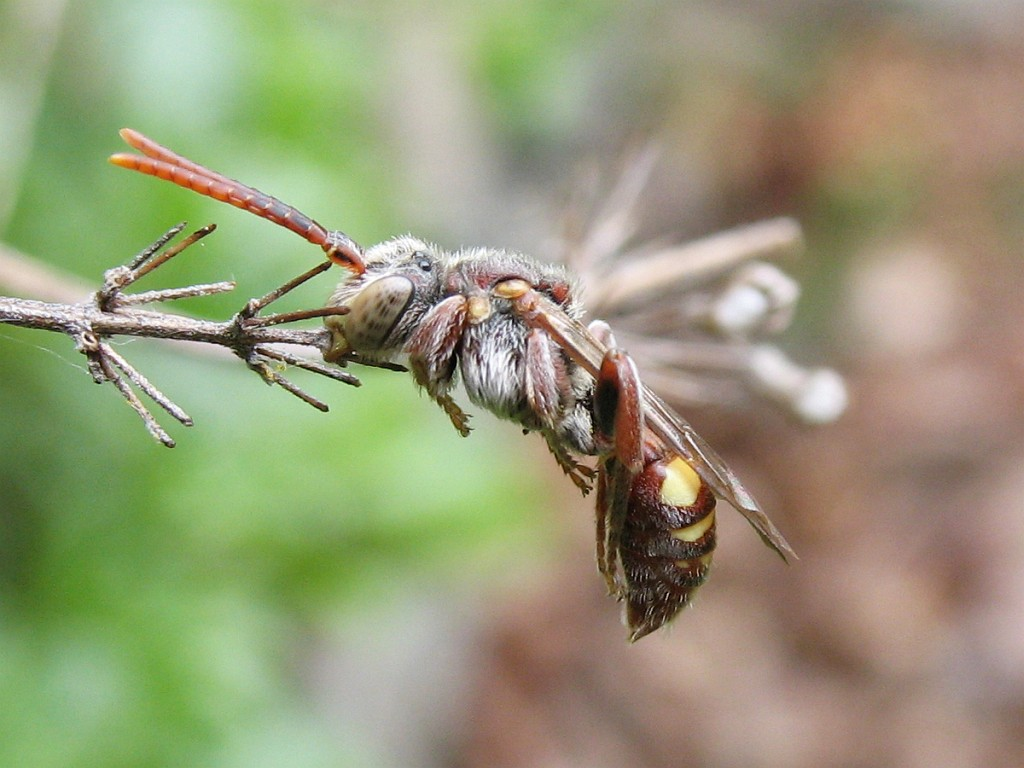
Cuckoo bee from the genus Nomada

There are many lineages of cuckoo bees, all of which lay their eggs in the nest cells of other bees, often within the same family. Bombus bohemicus, for example, parasitises several other species in its genus, including B. terrestris, B. lucorum, and B. cryptarum. These are instances of Emery's rule, named for the Italian entomologist Carlo Emery, which asserts that social parasites among insects, including kleptoparasites, tend to be closely related to their hosts. The largest monophyletic lineage of kleptoparasitic bees is Nomadinae (a subfamily of Apidae), which comprises several hundred species in 35 genera.

Some bees and their parasites
Host genus	Parasite genus
Bombus	Bombus (Psithyrus)
Anthophora	Melecta, Zacosmia
Amegilla	Thyreus
Megachile	Coelioxys

The cuckoo wasps (Chrysididae) lay their eggs in the nests of potter and mud dauber wasps. Other families of wasps have "cuckoo" species that parasitise related species, as for example Polistes sulcifer, which parasitises a related species, P. dominula. Numerous other wasp families have genera or larger lineages of which some or all members are kleptoparasitic (e.g., the genus Ceropales in Pompilidae and the tribe Nyssonini in Crabronidae). Some of these species are inquilines and brood parasites rather than kleptoparasites.

Others are dubbed kleptoparasitoids, namely parasitoids that select hosts that have been parasitized by another female. Kleptoparasitoids may make use of the punctures made by previous parasitoids on their hosts; may follow the trails or traces left by parasitoids to locate hosts; or use hosts already weakened by other parasitoids. Especially the latter is referred to as pirate parasitism.

==== Flies ====
Sarcophaga sp. feeding on captured prey (Tipulidae) of a spider (video, 1 m 44 s)

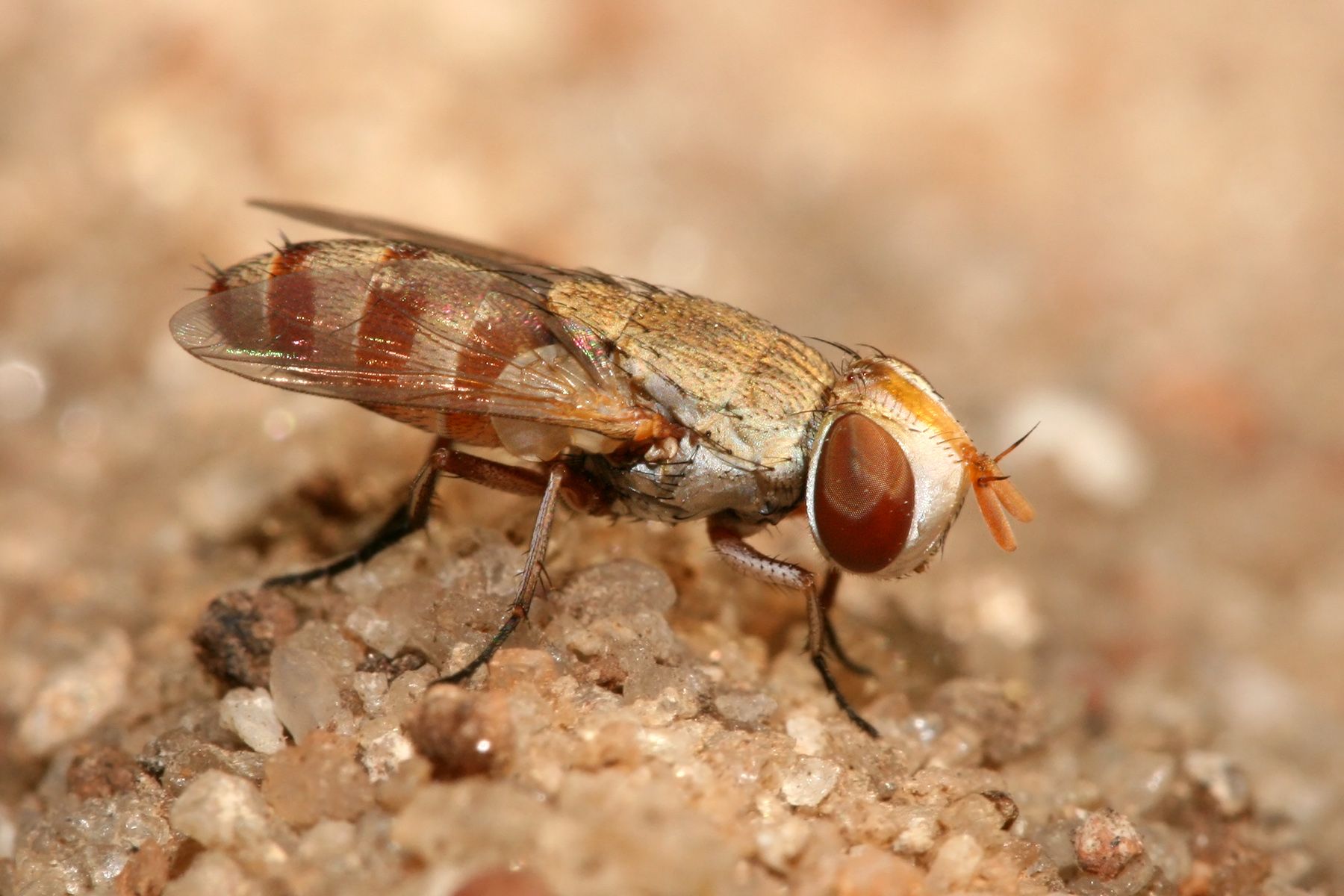
Miltogrammine fly (Craticulina seriata) is a kleptoparasite of sand wasps, depositing its larvae on the food reserved for the larvae of the wasp

Some true flies (Diptera) are kleptoparasites; the strategy is especially common in the subfamily Miltogramminae of the family Sarcophagidae. There are also some kleptoparasites in the families Chloropidae and Milichiidae. Some adult milichiids, for example, visit spider webs where they scavenge on half-eaten stink bugs. Others are associated with robber flies (Asilidae), or Crematogaster ants. Flies in the genus Bengalia (Calliphoridae) steal food and pupae transported by ants and are often found beside their foraging trails. Musca albina (Muscidae) reportedly shows kleptoparasitic behaviour, laying eggs only in dung balls being interred by one of several co-occurring dung-rolling scarab species.

==== Dung beetles ====
Scarab dung beetles relocate large amounts of vertebrate dung, rolling balls of the material to their nests for their larvae to feed on. Several smaller species of dung beetle do not gather dung themselves but take it from the nests of larger species. For example, species of Onthophagus enter dung-balls while Scarabeus beetles are making them.

==== True bugs ====
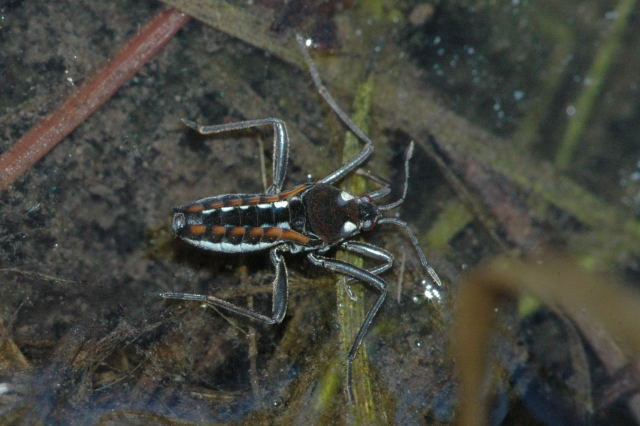
Velia caprai (Ardennes, Belgium)

Many semiaquatic bugs (Heteroptera) are kleptoparasitic on their own species. In one study, whenever the bug Velia caprai (water cricket) took prey heavier than 7.9 mg, other bugs of the same species joined it and successfully ate parts of the prey.

==== Spiders ====
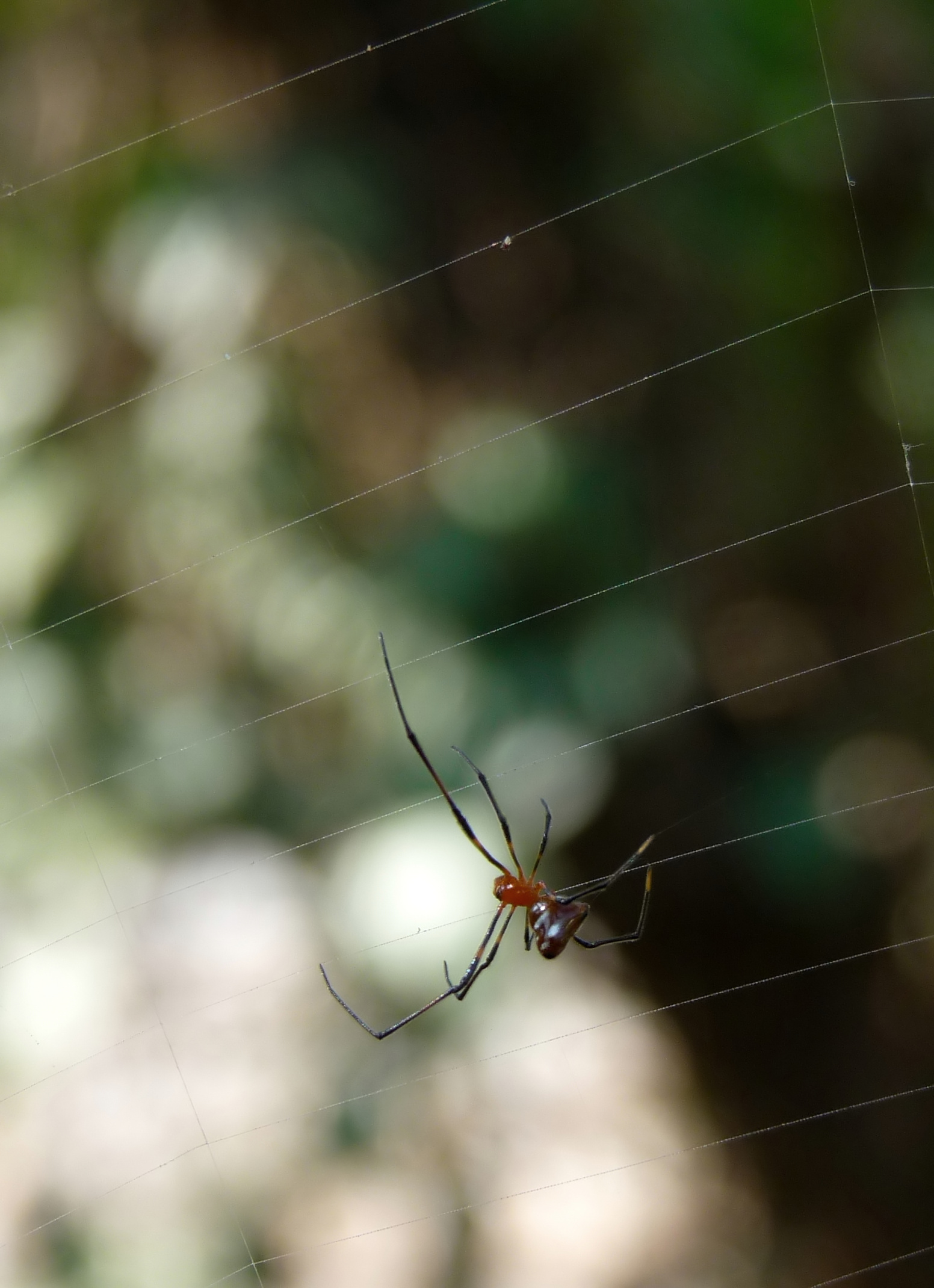
Argyrodes flavescens on the web of Argiope pulchella

Kleptoparasitic spiders, which steal or feed on prey captured by other spiders, are known to occur in five families:

- Theridiidae (Argyrodes species)
- Dictynidae (Archaeodictyna ulova)
- Salticidae (species of Portia and Simaetha)
- Symphytognathidae (Curimagua bayano)
- Mysmenidae (Isela okuncana, Isela inquilina, and Mysmenopsis species).

=== Vertebrates ===
==== Birds ====
A few bird species are specialist kleptoparasites, while many others are opportunistic. Skuas (including jaegers) and frigatebirds rely heavily on chasing other seabirds to obtain food. Other species—including raptors, gulls, terns, coots, and some ducks and shorebirds—do so opportunistically. Among opportunists such as the roseate tern, parent birds involved in kleptoparasitism are more successful in raising broods than non-kleptoparasitic individuals. Bald eagles have been seen attacking smaller raptors, such as ospreys, to steal fish from them. Among passerine birds, masked shrikes have been recorded stealing food from wheatears, and Eurasian blackbirds have been recorded stealing smashed snails from other thrushes.

During seabird nesting seasons, frigatebirds soar above seabird colonies, waiting for parent birds to return to their nests with food for their young. As the returning birds approach the colony, the frigatebirds, which are fast and agile, swoop in to pursue them vigorously; they sometimes seize tropicbirds by their long tail plumes. The name frigatebird, as well as many of the frigatebirds' colloquial names, including man-o'-war bird and pirate of the sea, denote this behaviour. However, the amount of food obtained by kleptoparasitism in the magnificent frigatebird may be marginal.

Gulls are both perpetrators and victims of opportunistic kleptoparasitism, particularly during the breeding season. While the victim is most often another member of the same species, other (principally smaller) gulls and terns can also be targeted. In the Americas, as brown pelicans surface and empty the water from their bills, they sometimes have their food stolen by Heermann's gulls and laughing gulls, which lurk nearby and grab escaping food items. Great black-backed gulls are skilled kleptoparasites, stealing from other gulls and from raptors. Several species of gull steal food from humans, for example takeaway food at seaside resorts.

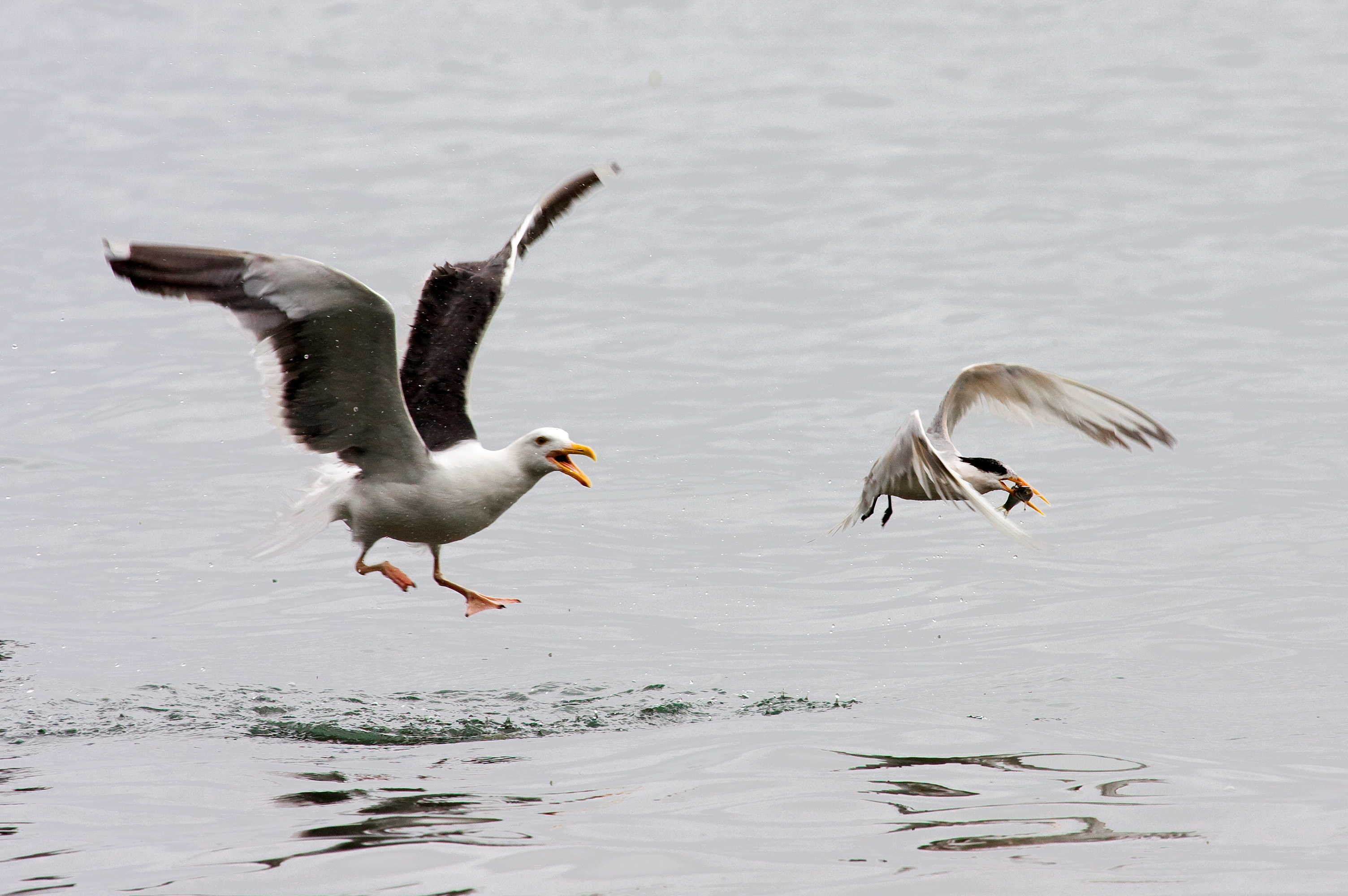
Western gull (Larus occidentalis) in pursuit of an elegant tern (Thalasseus elegans)

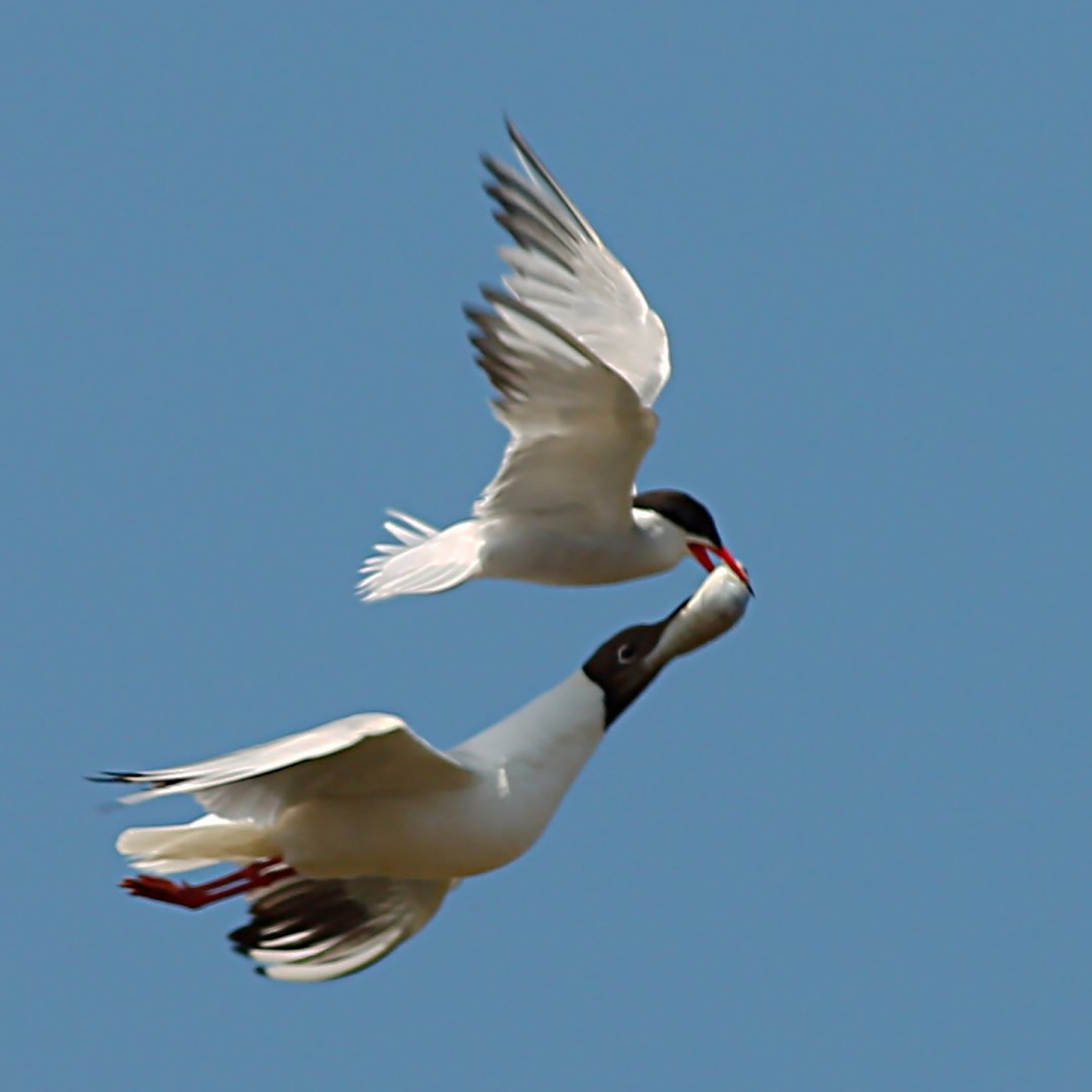
Black-headed gull (Chroicocephalus ridibundus) attempting to steal a fish caught by a common tern (Sterna hirundo)

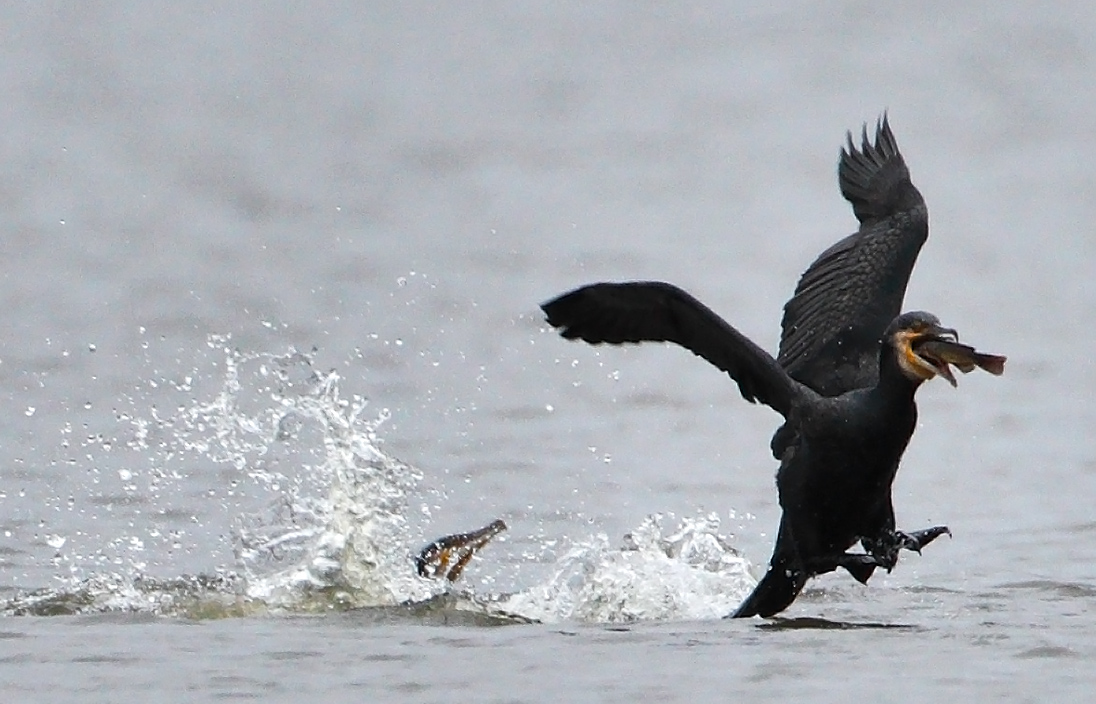
The flying great cormorant (Phalacrocorax carbo) has taken a fish from the one in the water.

==== Mammals ====
The relationship between spotted hyenas and lions, in which each species steals the other's kills, is a form of kleptoparasitism. Cheetahs are common targets. Bears, coyotes and wolves are very opportunistic and all have this behavior. Crab-eating macaques have also exhibited kleptoparasitic behaviors. All hyena species engage in this behavior when they can, as do jackals. Human hunters may commonly take the remains of fresh kills from other carnivores, such as lions and Eurasian lynx. Risso's dolphins have been observed charging "head-on" at sperm whales, causing them to open their mouths; it has been suggested that the observed harassment results in some regurgitation, and that the food is then eaten by the Risso's dolphins. The behaviour is rare and may be opportunistic. Similar behavior targeting Bigeye trevally has been seen practiced by one individual bottlenose dolphin.

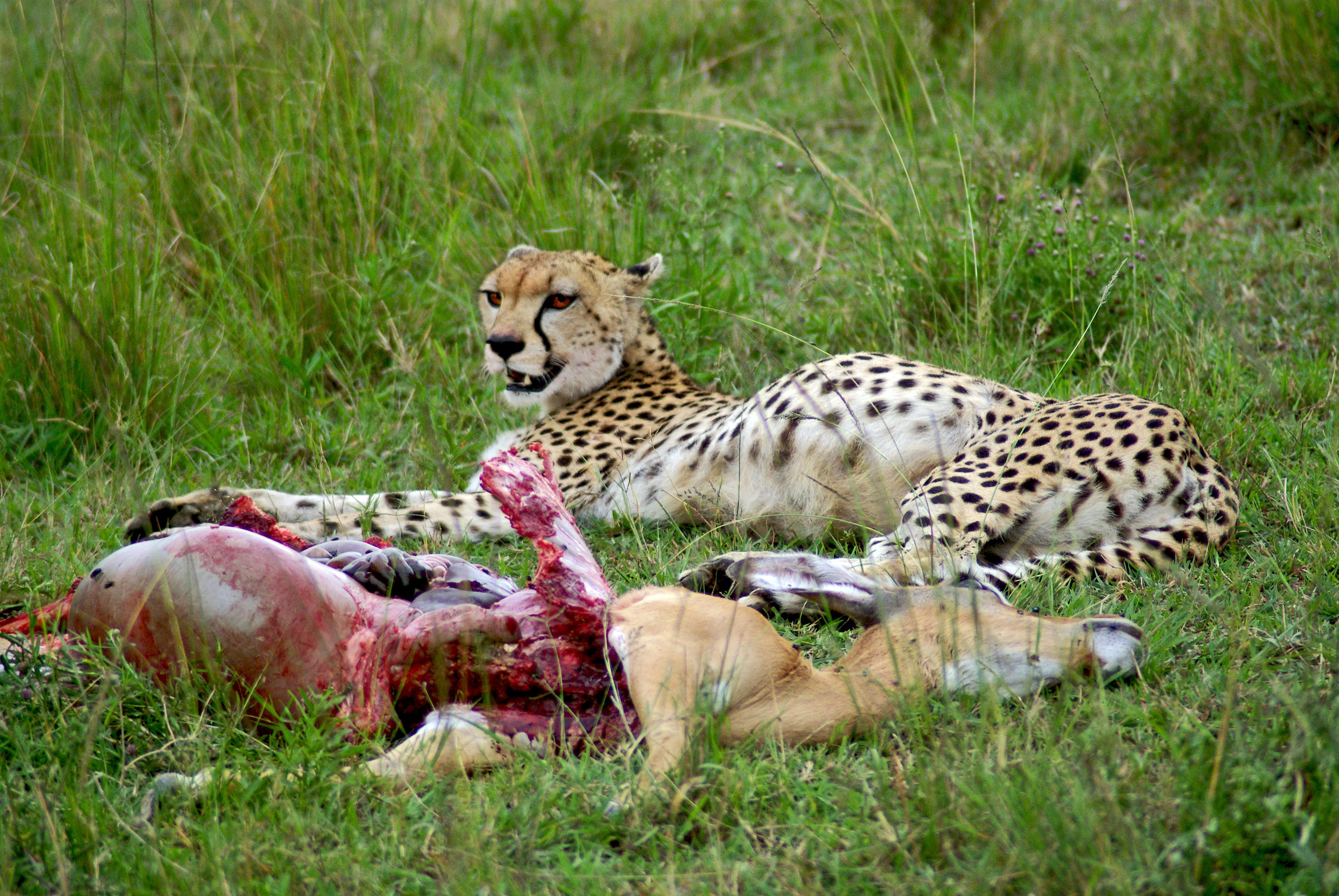
A cheetah has killed an impala (and eaten part of it), creating a target for kleptoparasitism.

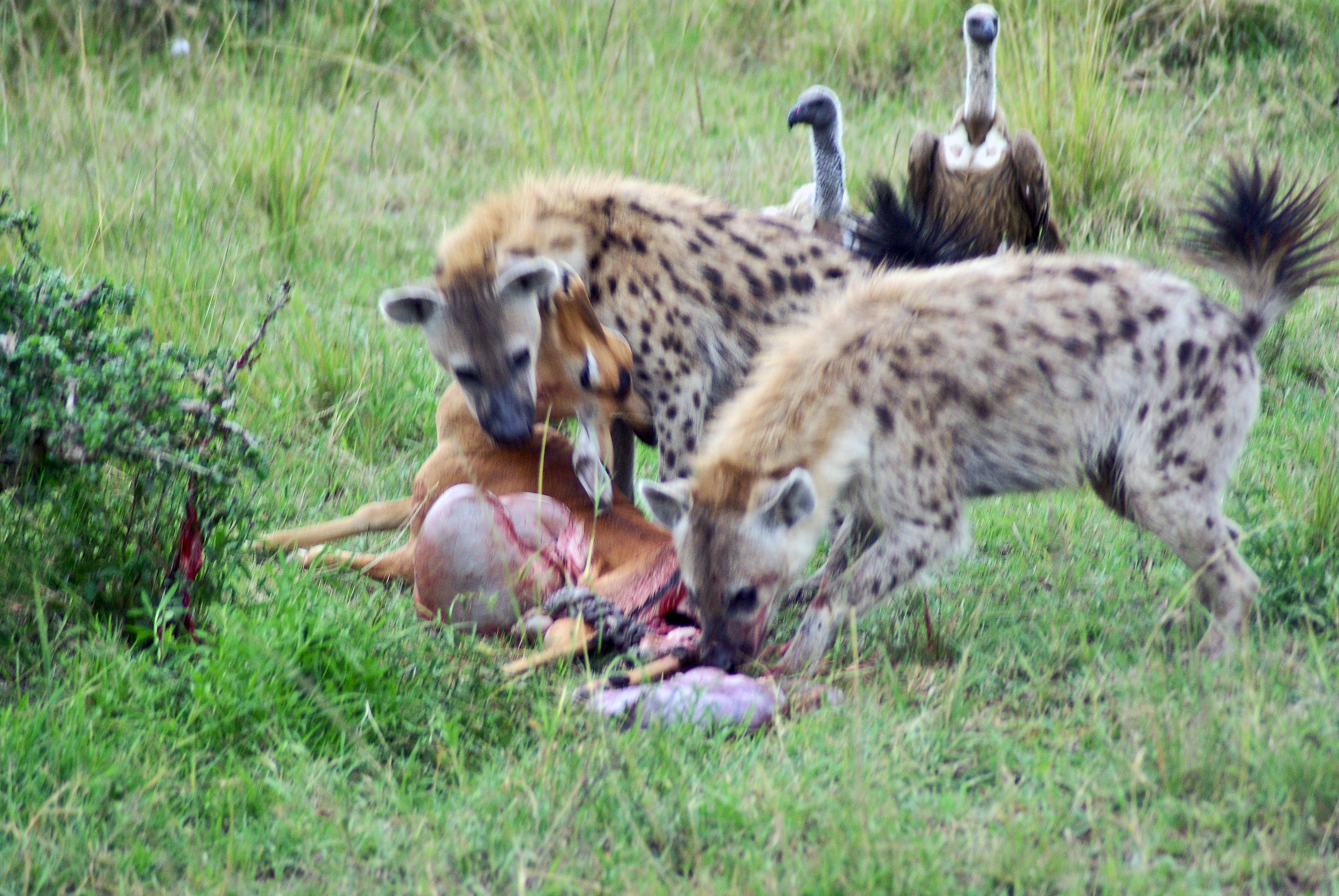
A little later, the hyenas have driven off the cheetah and are feeding.

== See also ==
- Evolutionary models of food sharing
- Kleptomania
