= Drungena =

Scientific classification
- Kingdom: Animalia
- Phylum: Arthropoda
- Subphylum: Chelicerata
- Class: Arachnida
- Order: Araneae
- Infraorder: Araneomorphae
- Family: Mysmenidae
- Genus: Drungena; Lin & S. Li, 2023

Type species
- Mysmena haban Miller, Griswold & Yin, 2009

Species
- 2, see text

Genus of spiders

Drungena is a genus of spiders in the family Mysmenidae.

== Distribution ==
Drungena is endemic to China. Both described species are only found in Gongshan County, Yunnan.

== Etymology ==
The genus name is a combination of Drung, and indigenous people from the Gaoligong Mountains, and the related genus Mysmena.

D. crewsae is named in honor of US arachnologist Sarah C. Crews.

D. haban is named after its type locality, Haban Falls in Gongshan County, Yunnan.

== Species ==
As of January 2026, this genus includes two species:

- Drungena crewsae Q. Zhang, S. Li & Lin, 2023 – China
- Drungena haban (Miller, Griswold & Yin, 2009) – China
