= Mengmena =

Scientific classification
- Kingdom: Animalia
- Phylum: Arthropoda
- Subphylum: Chelicerata
- Class: Arachnida
- Order: Araneae
- Infraorder: Araneomorphae
- Family: Mysmenidae
- Genus: Mengmena; Lin & Li, 2022

Type species
- M. banna Lin & Li, 2022

Species
- 4, see text

Genus of spiders

Mengmena is a genus of spiders in the family Mysmenidae.

== Distribution ==
Mengmena is endemic to China.

== Etymology ==
The genus name is a combination of the type locality Menglun Town (勐仑镇; Měng lún zhèn), Mengla County, Xishuangbanna (西双版纳; Xīshuāngbǎnnà) and the related genus Mysmena.

== Species ==
As of January 2026, this genus includes four species:

- Mengmena banna Lin & Li, 2022 – China
- Mengmena lushui Q. Zhang, S. Li & Lin, 2023 – China
- Mengmena mangkuan Q. Zhang, S. Li & Lin, 2023 – China
- Mengmena yulin Lin & Li, 2022 – China
