= Mosu (spider) =

Scientific classification
- Kingdom: Animalia
- Phylum: Arthropoda
- Subphylum: Chelicerata
- Class: Arachnida
- Order: Araneae
- Infraorder: Araneomorphae
- Family: Mysmenidae
- Genus: Mosu; Miller, Griswold & Yin, 2009

Type species
- M. nujiang Miller, Griswold & Yin, 2009

Species
- 8, see text

Genus of spiders

Mosu is a genus of East Asian spurred orb-weavers first described by J. A. Miller, C. E. Griswold & C. M. Yin in 2009.

== Species ==
As of August 2023 it contains eight species:

- Mosu aludi Q. Zhang, S. Li & Lin, 2023 — China
- Mosu banpo Q. Zhang, S. Li & Lin, 2023 — China
- Mosu dayan Lin & Li, 2013 — China
- Mosu heguomu Lin & Li, 2022 — China
- Mosu huogou Miller, Griswold & Yin, 2009 — China
- Mosu nujiang Miller, Griswold & Yin, 2009 — China
- Mosu tanjia Lin & Li, 2013 — China
- Mosu zhengi (Lin & Li, 2008) — China
