= Isela inquilina =

Scientific classification
- Domain: Eukaryota
- Kingdom: Animalia
- Phylum: Arthropoda
- Subphylum: Chelicerata
- Class: Arachnida
- Order: Araneae
- Infraorder: Araneomorphae
- Family: Mysmenidae
- Genus: Isela
- Species: I. inquilina

Binomial name
- Isela inquilina (Baert & Murphy, 1985)

Species of spider

Isela inquilina, originally described as Kilifia inquilina, is a species of true spider in the family Mysmenidae. The species is endemic to Kenya and was first described by L. L. Baert and J. A. Murphy in 1985.

== Taxonomy ==
Kilifia inquilina, originally described by Baert and Murphy in 1987 under the name Kilifia, was later placed in the genus Kilifina as a replacement name in 1992 due to the preoccupation of the former. Kilifia inquilina was transferred to the genus Isela following a synonymy of genera as noted by Lopardo and Hormiga in 2015. The former genus name Kilifia is derived from Kilifi, which is the type locality in Kenya where this species was first collected.

== Description ==
Isela inquilina is a small spider, with body lengths ranging from 1.7 to 2.2 millimeters. Its carapace is brownish and displays darker striae, while the sternum is a dull greyish color with a dark border. The legs have a brown-yellow hue, and the abdomen can appear greyish or creamy, often covered in long hairs.

In males, total body length varies from 1.70 to 1.83 millimeters. The carapace is longer than it is wide, adorned with a row of dorsal spines and a subtle depression in front of the posterior median eyes. The arrangement of the eyes is circular, with the anterior median, anterior lateral, and posterior lateral eyes grouped closely, while the posterior median eyes are spaced apart. The male palpus features an elongated tibia that ends with a notable row of long, flat spines. The cymbium has a relatively simple structure with a stout thorn, and the embolus is needle-like, spiraling toward the apex.

Females are slightly larger, measuring between 2.00 and 2.22 millimeters in total body length. Their carapace dimensions range from 0.83 to 0.93 millimeters in length and 0.67 to 0.73 millimeters in width. The vulva features short copulatory ducts, with their openings positioned deep beneath the epigastric plate. The retrolateral diverticulae are long and coiled, while the spermathecal duct is also long and coiled. The type locality for Isela inquilina is Kilifi, Kenya. Specimens were collected on several dates, including 31 August 1977, 8 September 1977, 16 September 1977, and 9 August 1980. The types are currently held at the British Museum of Natural History, the Royal Belgian Institute for Natural Sciences, and the Royal Museum for Central Africa.

== Habitat and ecology ==
Isela inquilina has been observed living within the webs of Ischnothele karschi, which are complex structures that collect debris and provide habitat for various small arthropods. The kleptoparasitic behavior of this species suggests that it feeds on prey captured by its host spider. Observations indicate that Isela inquilina was the most common inquiline spider found during a survey of Ischnothele karschi webs, followed by other species such as Portia schultzii, which tends to hide within the webs.
