= Microdipoena saltuensis =

Scientific classification
- Kingdom: Animalia
- Phylum: Arthropoda
- Subphylum: Chelicerata
- Class: Arachnida
- Order: Araneae
- Infraorder: Araneomorphae
- Family: Mysmenidae
- Genus: Microdipoena
- Species: M. saltuensis

Binomial name
- Microdipoena saltuensis (Simon, 1895)

Synonyms
- Mysmena saltuensis Simon, 1895; Mysmenella saltuensis Brignoli, 1980

Species of spider

Microdipoena saltuensis, is a species of spider of the genus Microdipoena. It is endemic to Sri Lanka.
