= Brasilionata =

Scientific classification
- Domain: Eukaryota
- Kingdom: Animalia
- Phylum: Arthropoda
- Subphylum: Chelicerata
- Class: Arachnida
- Order: Araneae
- Infraorder: Araneomorphae
- Family: Mysmenidae
- Genus: Brasilionata
- Species: B. arborense

Binomial name
- Brasilionata arborense Wunderlich, 1995

Genus of spiders

Brasilionata is a genus of Brazilian spiders first described by Wunderlich in 1995. It is represented by a single species, B. arborense. The defining characteristics of this genus include a homogeneous color pattern on the back of the abdomen, setae on the cymbial fold the same size as other setae, a space between the anterior median eyes, and a pointed switch on the end of the palpal bulb similar to that of Microdipoena. Only two specimens have been identified, one in 1995 and another in 2015.
