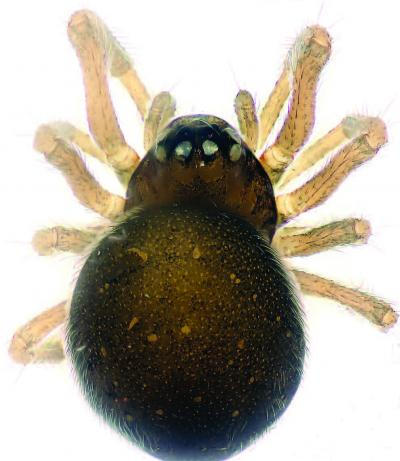
- Mysmena wawuensis

Scientific classification
- Kingdom: Animalia
- Phylum: Arthropoda
- Subphylum: Chelicerata
- Class: Arachnida
- Order: Araneae
- Infraorder: Araneomorphae
- Family: Mysmenidae
- Genus: Mysmena
- Species: M. wawuensis

Binomial name
- Mysmena wawuensis Lin & Li, 2013

= Mysmena wawuensis =

Species of spider

Mysmena wawuensis is a species of spider found in China. It grows to 0.75 millimetres long. It is named after the Wawu Mountain National Forest Park in Sichuan Province in southwestern China where it was discovered and first described in 2013 by Yucheng Lin and Shuqiang Li. It was collected from the leaf litter at an altitude of 1,929 metres (6,329 ft) and is only known from the type locality.

== Description ==
Measuring just 0.75 mm (0.03 in) long, Mysmena wawuensis is one of the smallest spiders known. The carapace is round in the male and pear-shaped in the female. The cephalothorax is brown with dark margins, the sternum is black and the disproportionately large opisthosoma is black, with yellow flecks.
