= Mysmenopsis =

Mysmenopsis Temporal range: Neogene–present

Scientific classification
- Kingdom: Animalia
- Phylum: Arthropoda
- Subphylum: Chelicerata
- Class: Arachnida
- Order: Araneae
- Infraorder: Araneomorphae
- Family: Mysmenidae
- Genus: Mysmenopsis; Simon, 1897

Type species
- Mysmenopsis femoralis Simon, 1898

Species
- 52, see text

Genus of spiders

Mysmenopsis is a kleptoparasitic genus of tiny tropical and subtropical American spiders in the family Mysmenidae. Most live in the funnelwebs of spiders in the family Dipluridae. M. archeri lives on webs of a species in the family Pholcidae, M. capac and M. cienaga have been observed living in Cyrtophora (Araneidae) webs. One reason why diplurid webs are preferred seems to be that they are persistent in time and space, sometimes spanning several years.

The monotypic genus Isela is closely related.

Mysmenopsis furtiva from Jamaica lives as a kleptoparasite and commensal in webs of Ischnothele xera. It steals portions of its host's prey, but also consumes minute trapped insects that are not sought after by the host. In order not to be recognized, it moves only slowly when the host does not move; else it synchronizes its rapid movements with the movements of the host. M. furtiva has been observed to feed on one end of a prey animal, while the host feeds on the other. When feeding, its legs and pedipalps remain motionless, but its abdomen sways slowly and slightly. One feeding bout can double its abdominal volume. The host shows anti-kleptoparasite behavior, amongst others by adding silk between the kleptoparasite and the feeding site.

The closely related M. furtiva and M. monticola parasitize two spider species that are also closely related, and it is believed that the two groups coevolved.

== Species ==
As of September 2022 it contains fifty-two species, found in the Americas:

- Mysmenopsis alvaroi Dupérré & Tapia, 2020 — Ecuador
- Mysmenopsis amazonica Dupérré & Tapia, 2020 — Ecuador
- Mysmenopsis angamarca Dupérré & Tapia, 2020 — Ecuador
- Mysmenopsis archeri Platnick & Shadab, 1978 — Brazil
- Mysmenopsis atahualpa Baert, 1990 — Peru, Ecuador
- Mysmenopsis awa Dupérré & Tapia, 2020 — Ecuador
- Mysmenopsis baerti Dupérré & Tapia, 2020 — Ecuador
- Mysmenopsis bartolozzii Dupérré & Tapia, 2020 — Ecuador
- Mysmenopsis beebei (Gertsch, 1960) — Trinidad
- Mysmenopsis capac Baert, 1990 — Peru
- Mysmenopsis chiquita Dupérré & Tapia, 2015 — Ecuador
- Mysmenopsis choco Dupérré & Tapia, 2020 — Ecuador
- Mysmenopsis cidrelicola (Simon, 1895) — Venezuela
- Mysmenopsis cienaga Müller, 1987 — Colombia, Peru
- Mysmenopsis corazon Dupérré & Tapia, 2020 — Ecuador
- Mysmenopsis cube Dupérré & Tapia, 2020 — Ecuador
- Mysmenopsis cymbia (Levi, 1956) — USA
- Mysmenopsis dipluramigo Platnick & Shadab, 1978 — Panama, Colombia
- Mysmenopsis femoralis Simon, 1897 — St. Vincent
- Mysmenopsis fernandoi Dupérré & Tapia, 2015 — Ecuador
- Mysmenopsis funebris Simon, 1897 — St. Vincent
- Mysmenopsis furtiva Coyle & Meigs, 1989 — Jamaica
- Mysmenopsis gamboa Platnick & Shadab, 1978 — Panama
- Mysmenopsis guanza Dupérré & Tapia, 2020 — Ecuador
- Mysmenopsis guayaca Dupérré & Tapia, 2020 — Ecuador
- Mysmenopsis huascar Baert, 1990 — Peru
- Mysmenopsis hunachi Dupérré & Tapia, 2020 — Ecuador
- Mysmenopsis ischnamigo Platnick & Shadab, 1978 — Panama, Trinidad, Peru
- Mysmenopsis ixlitla (Levi, 1956) — Mexico
- Mysmenopsis junin Dupérré & Tapia, 2020 — Ecuador
- Mysmenopsis kochalkai Platnick & Shadab, 1978 — Colombia
- Mysmenopsis lasrocas Dupérré & Tapia, 2020 — Ecuador
- Mysmenopsis lloa Dupérré & Tapia, 2020 — Ecuador
- Mysmenopsis mexcala Gertsch, 1960 — Mexico
- Mysmenopsis monticola Coyle & Meigs, 1989 — Jamaica
- Mysmenopsis onorei Dupérré & Tapia, 2015 — Ecuador
- Mysmenopsis otokiki Dupérré & Tapia, 2020 — Ecuador
- Mysmenopsis otonga Dupérré & Tapia, 2015 — Ecuador
- Mysmenopsis pachacutec Baert, 1990 — Peru
- Mysmenopsis palpalis (Kraus, 1955) — Mexico, Guatemala, Honduras
- Mysmenopsis penai Platnick & Shadab, 1978 — Ecuador, Colombia
- Mysmenopsis pululahua Dupérré & Tapia, 2020 — Ecuador
- Mysmenopsis salazarae Dupérré & Tapia, 2020 — Ecuador
- Mysmenopsis schlingeri Platnick & Shadab, 1978 — Peru
- Mysmenopsis shushufindi Dupérré & Tapia, 2020 — Ecuador
- Mysmenopsis tengellacompa Platnick, 1993 — Costa Rica
- Mysmenopsis tepuy Dupérré & Tapia, 2020 — Ecuador
- Mysmenopsis tibialis (Bryant, 1940) — Cuba
- Mysmenopsis tungurahua Dupérré & Tapia, 2020 — Ecuador
- Mysmenopsis viracocha Baert, 1990 — Peru
- Mysmenopsis wygodzinskyi Platnick & Shadab, 1978 — Peru
- Mysmenopsis yupanqui Baert, 1990 — Peru
