= Yamaneta =

Scientific classification
- Kingdom: Animalia
- Phylum: Arthropoda
- Subphylum: Chelicerata
- Class: Arachnida
- Order: Araneae
- Infraorder: Araneomorphae
- Family: Mysmenidae
- Genus: Yamaneta; Miller & Lin, 2019

Type species
- Maymena paquini (Miller, Griswold & Yin, 2009)

Species
- Yamaneta kehen (Miller, Griswold & Yin, 2009); Yamaneta paquini (Miller, Griswold & Yin, 2009)

Genus of spiders

Yamaneta is a small genus of east Asian spurred orb-weavers. It was first described by C. C. Feng, J. A. Miller and Y. C. Lin in 2019, and it has only been found in China. As of February 2022 it contains only two species: Y. kehen and Y. paquini. The type species, Yamaneta paquini, was originally described under the name "Maymena paquini".

== See also ==
- Maymena
