= Mysmeniola =

Scientific classification
- Domain: Eukaryota
- Kingdom: Animalia
- Phylum: Arthropoda
- Subphylum: Chelicerata
- Class: Arachnida
- Order: Araneae
- Infraorder: Araneomorphae
- Family: Mysmenidae
- Genus: Mysmeniola
- Species: M. spinifera

Binomial name
- Mysmeniola spinifera Thaler, 1995

Genus of spiders

Mysmeniola is a genus of spiders in the family Mysmenidae. It was first described in 1995 by Thaler. As of 2017, it contains only one species, Mysmeniola spinifera, found in Venezuela.
