= Chanea =

Scientific classification
- Kingdom: Animalia
- Phylum: Arthropoda
- Subphylum: Chelicerata
- Class: Arachnida
- Order: Araneae
- Infraorder: Araneomorphae
- Family: Mysmenidae
- Genus: Chanea; Miller, Griswold & Yin, 2009

Species
- Chanea suukyii Miller, Griswold & Yin, 2009; Chanea voluta Lin & Li, 2016

Genus of spiders

Chanea is a genus of Chinese spiders in the family Mysmenidae first discovered in 2009. The name is derived from the Chinese word for "coil", referring to the coiled whip-like extension of the palpal bulb, a defining characteristic of the genus. There are two species in the genus, one described in 2009 and the other in 2016.
