= Simaoa =

Scientific classification
- Domain: Eukaryota
- Kingdom: Animalia
- Phylum: Arthropoda
- Subphylum: Chelicerata
- Class: Arachnida
- Order: Araneae
- Infraorder: Araneomorphae
- Family: Mysmenidae
- Genus: Simaoa; Yin

Species
- Simaoa bianjing Miller, Griswold & Yin, 2009; Simaoa kavanaugh Miller, Griswold & Yin, 2009; Simaoa maku Miller, Griswold & Yin, 2009; Simaoa yaojia Miller, Griswold & Yin, 2009

Genus of spiders

Simaoa is a genus of spiders in the family Mysmenidae. It was first described in 2009 by Miller, Griswold & Yin. As of 2016, it contains 4 species, all from China.
