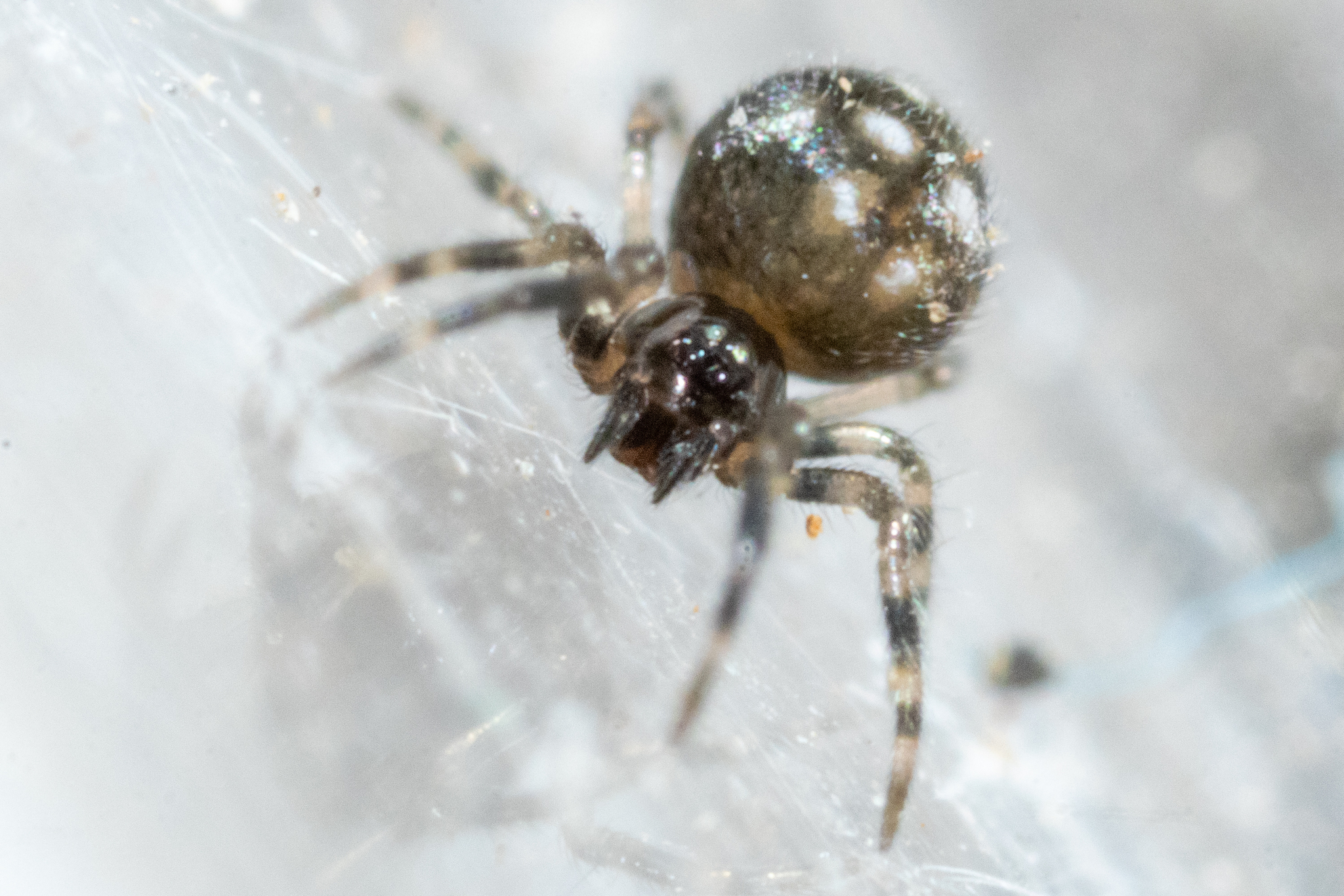
- female M. guttata
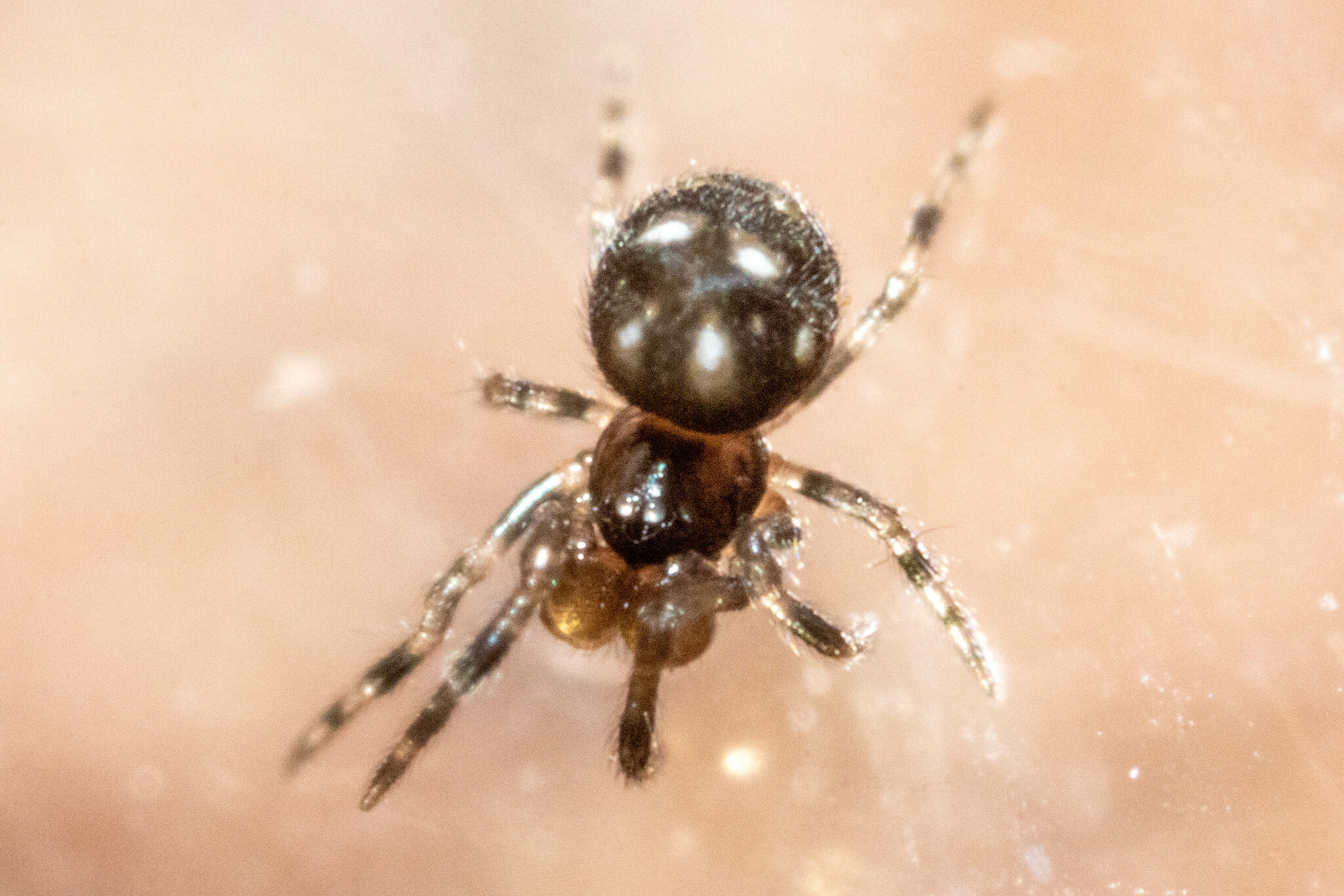
- male M. guttata

Scientific classification
- Kingdom: Animalia
- Phylum: Arthropoda
- Subphylum: Chelicerata
- Class: Arachnida
- Order: Araneae
- Infraorder: Araneomorphae
- Family: Mysmenidae
- Genus: Microdipoena
- Species: M. guttata

Binomial name
- Microdipoena guttata Banks, 1895

= Microdipoena guttata =

Species of spider

Microdipoena guttata is a species of true spider in the family Mysmenidae. It is found in a range from the United States to Paraguay.
