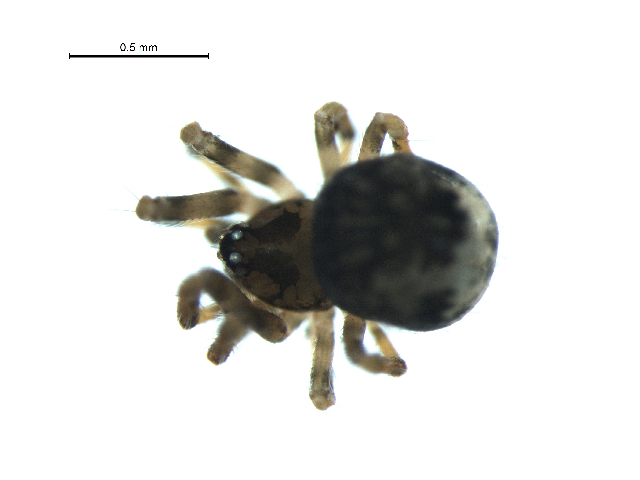
- T. paradoxa, adult female

Scientific classification
- Kingdom: Animalia
- Phylum: Arthropoda
- Subphylum: Chelicerata
- Class: Arachnida
- Order: Araneae
- Infraorder: Araneomorphae
- Family: Mysmenidae
- Genus: Trogloneta; Simon, 1922

Type species
- T. granulum Simon, 1922

Species
- 12, see text

= Trogloneta =

Genus of spiders

Trogloneta is a genus of spurred orb-weavers that was first described by Eugène Louis Simon in 1922.

== Species ==
As of September 2019 it contains twelve species, found in Europe, China, Japan, the United States, and Brazil:

- Trogloneta canariensis Wunderlich, 1987 – Canary Is.
- Trogloneta cantareira Brescovit & Lopardo, 2008 – Brazil
- Trogloneta cariacica Brescovit & Lopardo, 2008 – Brazil
- Trogloneta granulum Simon, 1922 (type) – Europe
- Trogloneta madeirensis Wunderlich, 1987 – Madeira
- Trogloneta mourai Brescovit & Lopardo, 2008 – Brazil
- Trogloneta nojimai (Ono, 2010) – Japan
- Trogloneta paradoxa Gertsch, 1960 – USA
- Trogloneta speciosum Lin & Li, 2008 – China
- Trogloneta uncata Lin & Li, 2013 – China
- Trogloneta yuensis Lin & Li, 2013 – China
- Trogloneta yunnanense (Song & Zhu, 1994) – China
