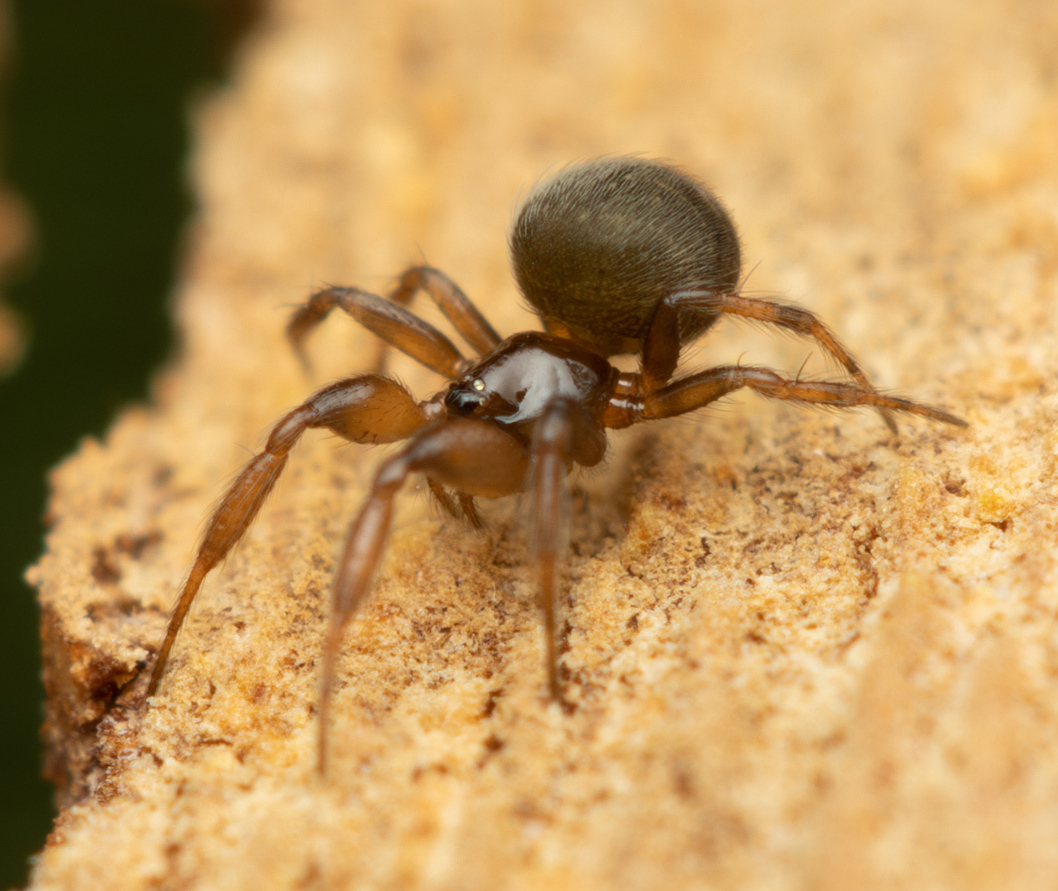
- female
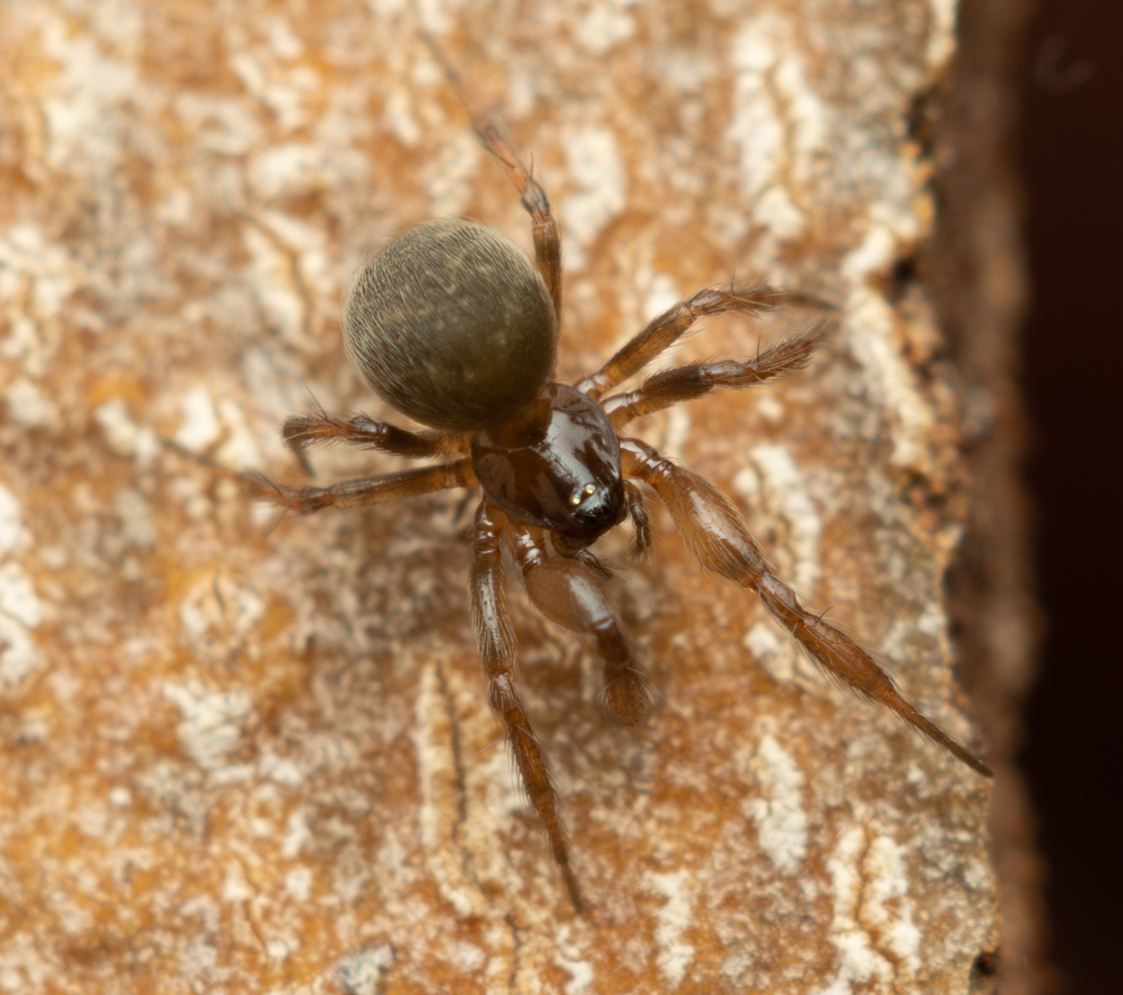
- female

Scientific classification
- Kingdom: Animalia
- Phylum: Arthropoda
- Subphylum: Chelicerata
- Class: Arachnida
- Order: Araneae
- Infraorder: Araneomorphae
- Family: Mysmenidae
- Genus: Isela
- Species: I. okuncana

Binomial name
- Isela okuncana Griswold, 1985

= Isela okuncana =

Species of spider

Isela okuncana is a species of true spider in the family Mysmenidae. The species was described in 1985 by Charles E. Griswold.

== Etymology ==
The species name is derived from the Zulu word okuncane, meaning something small.

== Description ==
The species can be recognized by the general characteristics of the genus and by the form of the male and female genitalia.

The male’s carapace is yellow-brown to grey, darker around the anterior eye row and along the lateral margin, with dark mottled lines radiating from the thoracic fovea. The abdomen is mottled dark grey with pale marks and spots, with additional pale streaks along the sides. The carapace has sparse setae, with a gently sloping thoracic declivity. The legs are yellow-brown with grey annuli, and the palpus features an elongate tibia and a circular palpal bulb. The male lacks any prominent leg ornamentation beyond a few clasping spines.

The female is similar to the male. The carapace and abdomen have similar coloration and markings. The legs follow the same pattern as the male, though the female lacks clasping spines on leg I. The female's abdomen is slightly more rounded, and the epigynum is characterized by distinct central and lateral lobes.

Isela okuncana was collected near the Tugela River in Natal, South Africa, in a hot, seasonally dry area known as Valley Bushveld. Specimens were taken from the webs of Allothele teretis, typically built in cool, shaded locations such as tree trunks and holes in stream banks. The spiders move freely within the host’s web and feed on prey fragments left by the host. They were observed in the webs of adult Allothele teretis with an average of about seven spiders per web.

The holotype male was collected at Mhlopeni Nature Reserve, Natal, South Africa, at an elevation of 900 m (2,950 ft). Paratypes are held in the Natal Museum and other collections.

== Reproduction ==
Mating takes place in the host's web, with males and females hanging inverted and facing each other during copulation. Females carry their nearly spherical eggsac attached to their spinnerets within the host's web.
