= Phricotelus =

Scientific classification
- Kingdom: Animalia
- Phylum: Arthropoda
- Subphylum: Chelicerata
- Class: Arachnida
- Order: Araneae
- Infraorder: Araneomorphae
- Family: Mysmenidae
- Genus: Phricotelus; Simon, 1895
- Species: P. stelliger

Binomial name
- Phricotelus stelliger Simon, 1895

Genus of spiders

Phricotelus stelliger is a species of spider of the monotypic genus Phricotelus. It is endemic to Sri Lanka.
