= Gaoligonga =

Scientific classification
- Domain: Eukaryota
- Kingdom: Animalia
- Phylum: Arthropoda
- Subphylum: Chelicerata
- Class: Arachnida
- Order: Araneae
- Infraorder: Araneomorphae
- Family: Mysmenidae
- Genus: Gaoligonga; Yin

Species
- Gaoligonga changya Miller, Griswold & Yin, 2009; Gaoligonga taeniata Lin & Li, 2014; Gaoligonga zhusun Miller, Griswold & Yin, 2009

Genus of spiders

Gaoligonga is a genus of spiders in the family Mysmenidae. It was first described in 2009 by Miller, Griswold & Yin. As of 2016, it contains 3 species from China and Vietnam.
