= Maymena =

Scientific classification
- Domain: Eukaryota
- Kingdom: Animalia
- Phylum: Arthropoda
- Subphylum: Chelicerata
- Class: Arachnida
- Order: Araneae
- Infraorder: Araneomorphae
- Family: Mysmenidae
- Genus: Maymena; Gertsch

Type species
- Maymena mayana

Species
- 13, see text

Genus of spiders

Maymena is a genus of spiders in the family Mysmenidae. It was first described in 1960 by Gertsch. As of 2017, it contains 13 species.

== Species ==
Maymena comprises the following species:

- Maymena ambita (Barrows, 1940)
- Maymena calcarata (Simon, 1898)
- Maymena cascada Gertsch, 1971
- Maymena chica Gertsch, 1960
- Maymena delicata Gertsch, 1971
- Maymena grisea Gertsch, 1971
- Maymena kehen Miller, Griswold & Yin, 2009
- Maymena mayana (Chamberlin & Ivie, 1938)
- Maymena misteca Gertsch, 1960
- Maymena paquini Miller, Griswold & Yin, 2009
- Maymena rica Platnick, 1993
- Maymena roca Baert, 1990
- Maymena sbordonii Brignoli, 1974
