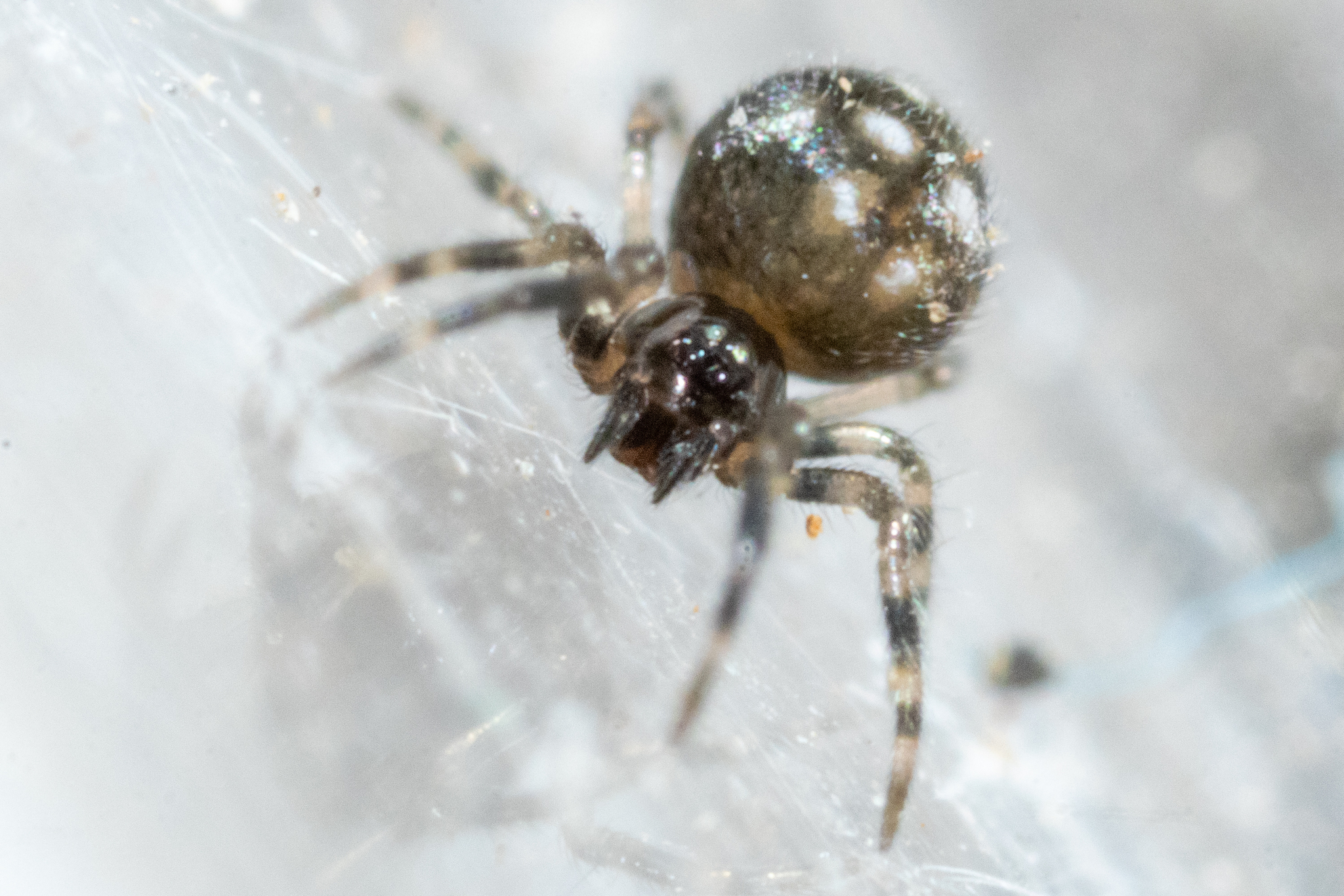
- female M. guttata
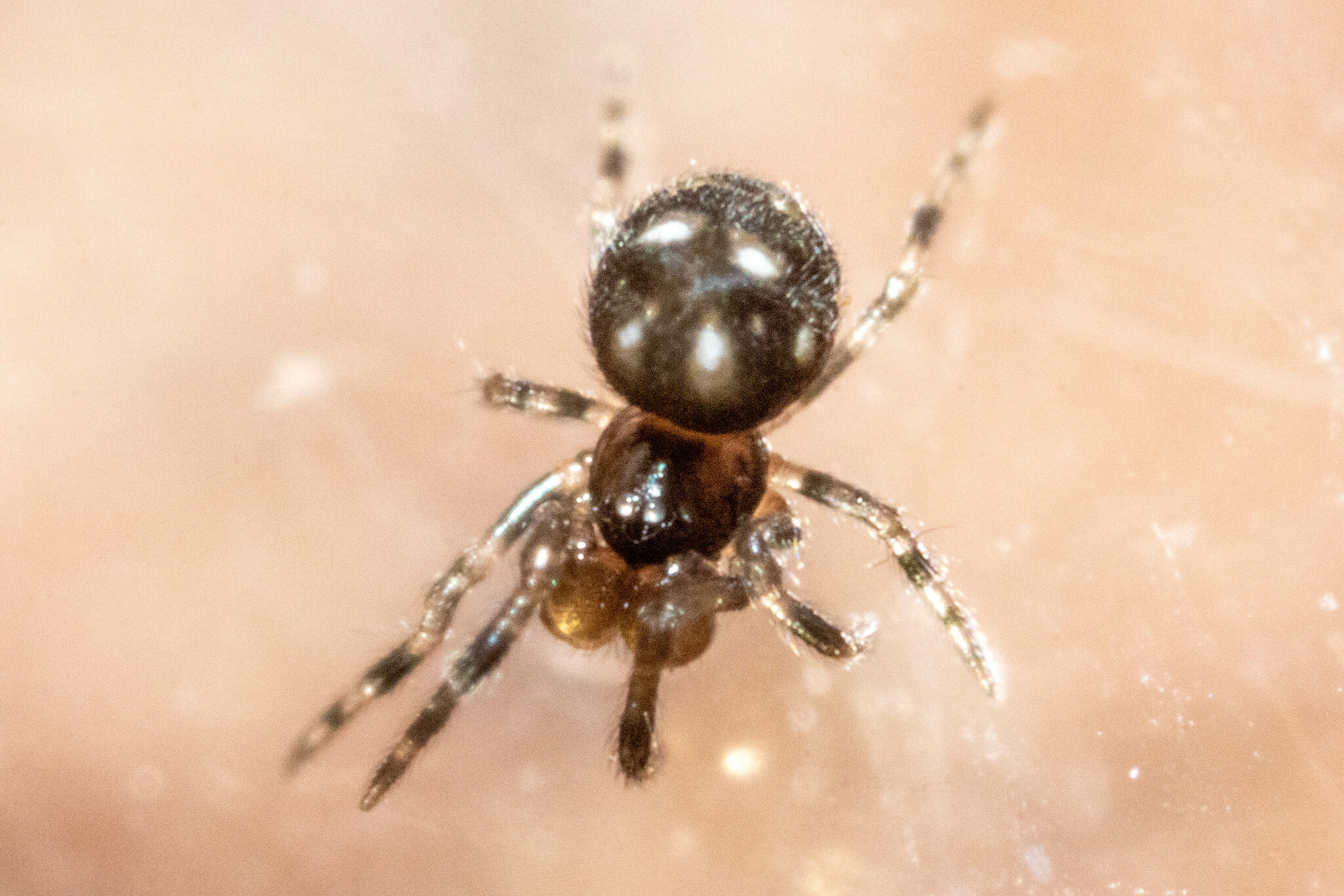
- male M. guttata

Scientific classification
- Kingdom: Animalia
- Phylum: Arthropoda
- Subphylum: Chelicerata
- Class: Arachnida
- Order: Araneae
- Infraorder: Araneomorphae
- Family: Mysmenidae
- Genus: Microdipoena; Banks, 1895

Type species
- Microdipoena guttata Banks, 1895

Species
- 21, see text

= Microdipoena =

Genus of spiders

Microdipoena is a cosmopolitan genus of dwarf cobweb weaver spiders in the family Mysmenidae. It was first described by Nathan Banks in 1895.

== Species ==
As of September 2025, this genus includes 21 species:

- Microdipoena comorensis (Baert, 1986) – Comoros
- Microdipoena elsae Saaristo, 1978 – Seychelles, Congo, Comoros
- Microdipoena gongi (Yin, Peng & Bao, 2004) – China
- Microdipoena guttata Banks, 1895 – Canada, United States, Paraguay. Introduced to Ivory Coast, DR Congo, Comoros (type species)
- Microdipoena huisun Zhang & Lin, 2023 – Taiwan
- Microdipoena illectrix (Simon, 1895) – Philippines
- Microdipoena jobi (Kraus, 1967) – Europe, Caucasus, Iran, China?, Japan?
- Microdipoena lisu Zhang & Lin, 2023 – China
- Microdipoena menglunensis (Lin & Li, 2008) – China
- Microdipoena mihindi (Baert, 1989) – Rwanda
- Microdipoena nyungwe Baert, 1989 – Rwanda, Tanzania, Madagascar
- Microdipoena ogatai (Ono, 2007) – Korea, Japan
- Microdipoena papuana (Baert, 1984) – New Guinea
- Microdipoena pseudojobi (Lin & Li, 2008) – China, Japan
- Microdipoena saltuensis (Simon, 1895) – Sri Lanka
- Microdipoena samoensis (Marples, 1955) – Samoa, Hawaii
- Microdipoena shenyang Zhang & Lin, 2023 – China, Korea
- Microdipoena thatitou Zhang & Lin, 2023 – Laos
- Microdipoena vanstallei Baert, 1985 – Cameroon
- Microdipoena yinae (Lin & Li, 2013) – China
- Microdipoena zhulin Zhang & Lin, 2023 – China
