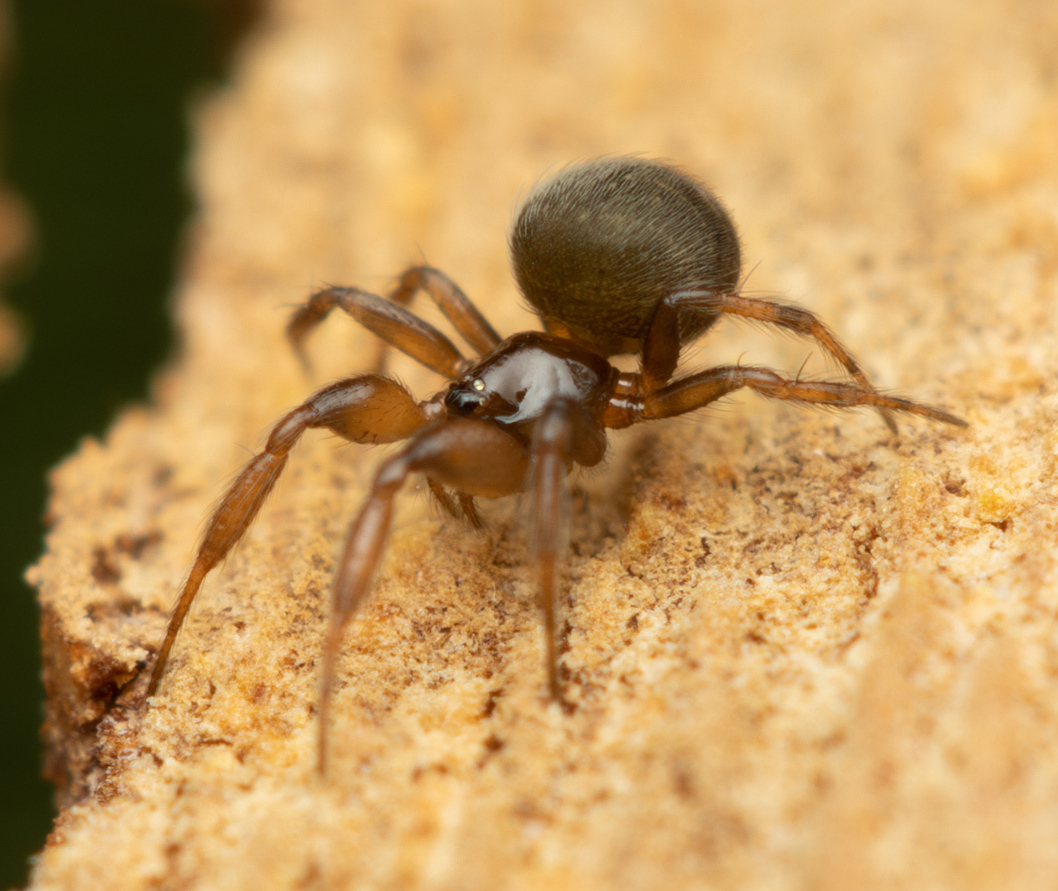
- female I. okuncana
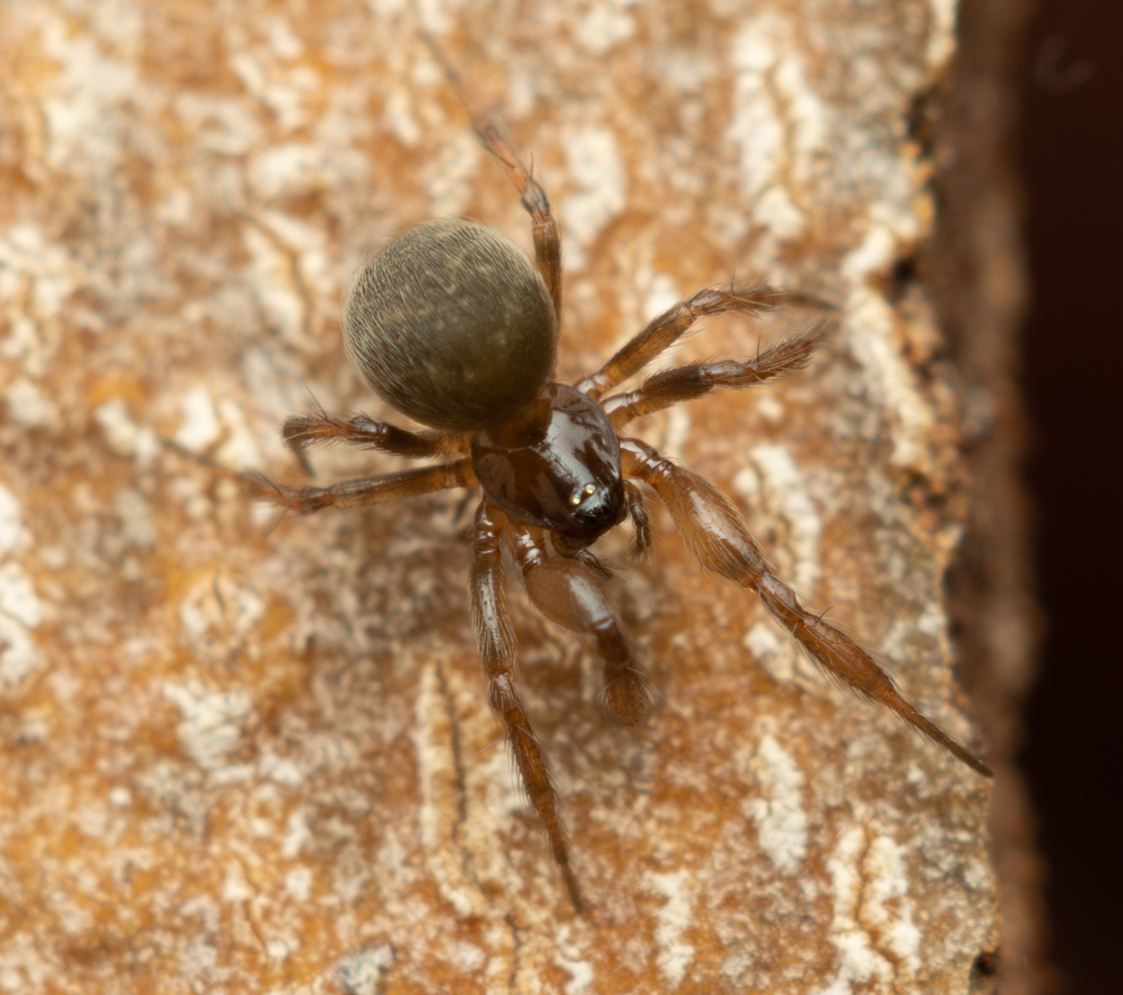
- female I. okuncana

Scientific classification
- Kingdom: Animalia
- Phylum: Arthropoda
- Subphylum: Chelicerata
- Class: Arachnida
- Order: Araneae
- Infraorder: Araneomorphae
- Family: Mysmenidae
- Genus: Isela; Griswold

Species
- Isela inquilina (Baert & Murphy, 1987); Isela okuncana Griswold, 1985

= Isela =

Genus of spiders

Isela is a genus of African spiders in the family Mysmenidae, first described in 1985 by Charles E. Griswold. It contains two African species.

== Species ==
As of October 2025, this genus includes two species:

- Isela inquilina (Baert & Murphy, 1987) – Kenya
- Isela okuncana Griswold, 1985 – South Africa (type species)
