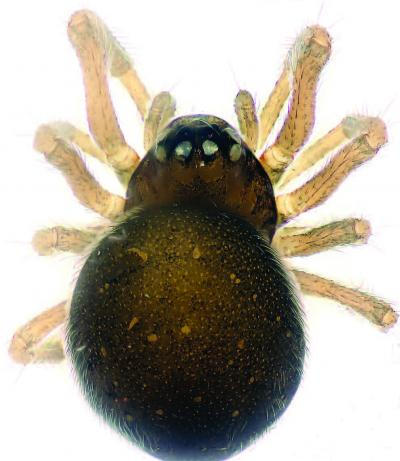
- Mysmena wawuensis female

Scientific classification
- Kingdom: Animalia
- Phylum: Arthropoda
- Subphylum: Chelicerata
- Class: Arachnida
- Order: Araneae
- Infraorder: Araneomorphae
- Family: Mysmenidae
- Genus: Mysmena; Simon, 1894

= Mysmena =

Mysmena Temporal range: Palaeogene–present

Genus of spiders

Mysmena is a genus of spiders in the family Mysmenidae, originally categorized as being part of the family Theridiidae. They are found in many parts of the world, namely China, Vietnam, Melanesia, parts of Australia, Polynesia, North and Central America, the Caribbean, Guyana, Southern Europe, and West Asia.

== Species ==
As of October 2026, the World Spider Catalog accepted the following species:

- Mysmena acuminata (Marples, 1955) – Samoa
- Mysmena arcilonga Lin & Li, 2008 – China
- Mysmena awari (Baert, 1984) – New Guinea
- Mysmena baoxingensis Lin & Li, 2013 – China
- Mysmena biangulata (Lin & Li, 2008) – China
- Mysmena bizi Miller, Griswold & Yin, 2009 – China
- Mysmena bucera Zhang, Li & Lin, 2023 – China
- Mysmena calypso Gertsch, 1960 – Trinidad
- Mysmena caribbaea (Gertsch, 1960) – Jamaica, Trinidad
- Mysmena changouzi Miller, Griswold & Yin, 2009 – China
- Mysmena colima (Gertsch, 1960) – Mexico
- Mysmena conica (Simon, 1895) – Algeria
- Mysmena cornigera (Lin & Li, 2008) – China
- Mysmena dai Lin & Li, 2022 – China
- Mysmena dulong Zhang, Li & Lin, 2023 – China
- Mysmena dumoga (Baert, 1988) – Sulawesi
- Mysmena furca Lin & Li, 2008 – China
- Mysmena gibbosa Snazell, 1986 – Spain
- Mysmena goudao Miller, Griswold & Yin, 2009 – China
- Mysmena guianensis Levi, 1956 – Guyana
- Mysmena incredula (Gertsch & Davis, 1936) – USA, Bahama Is., Cuba, Panama
- Mysmena isolata Forster, 1977 – St. Helena
- Mysmena jimudeng Zhang, Li & Lin 2023 – China
- Mysmena jinlong Miller, Griswold & Yin, 2009 – China
- Mysmena leichhardti Lopardo & Michalik, 2013 – Queensland
- Mysmena leucoplagiata (Simon, 1879) (type species) – Southern Europe to Azerbaijan, Israel
- Mysmena lulanga Lin & Li, 2016 – China
- Mysmena luosuo Lin & Li, 2022 – China
- Mysmena maculosa Lin & Li, 2014 – Vietnam
- Mysmena maku (Miller, Griswold & Yin, 2009) – China
- Mysmena marijkeae (Baert, 1982) – New Guinea
- Mysmena marplesi (Brignoli, 1980) – New Caledonia
- Mysmena mooatae (Baert, 1988) – Sulawesi
- Mysmena nubiai (Baert, 1984) – New Guinea
- Mysmena phyllicola (Marples, 1955) – Samoa, Niue
- Mysmena qinlangdang Zhang, Li & Lin, 2023 – China
- Mysmena quebecana Lopardo & Dupérré, 2008 – Canada
- Mysmena rostella Lin & Li, 2008 – China
- Mysmena rotunda (Marples, 1955) – Samoa
- Mysmena santacruzi (Baert & Maelfait, 1983) – Galapagos Is.
- Mysmena shibali Miller, Griswold & Yin, 2009 – China
- Mysmena spirala Lin & Li, 2008 – China
- Mysmena stathamae (Gertsch, 1960) – Mexico, Panama, Jamaica
- Mysmena tamdaoensis (Lin & Li, 2014) – Vietnam
- Mysmena tarautensis (Baert, 1988) – Sulawesi
- Mysmena tasmaniae Hickman, 1979 – Tasmania
- Mysmena tembei (Baert, 1984) – Paraguay
- Mysmena vangoethemi (Baert, 1982) – New Guinea
- Mysmena vitiensis Forster, 1959 – Fiji
- Mysmena wawuensis Lin & Li, 2013 – China
- Mysmena woodwardi Forster, 1959 – New Guinea
