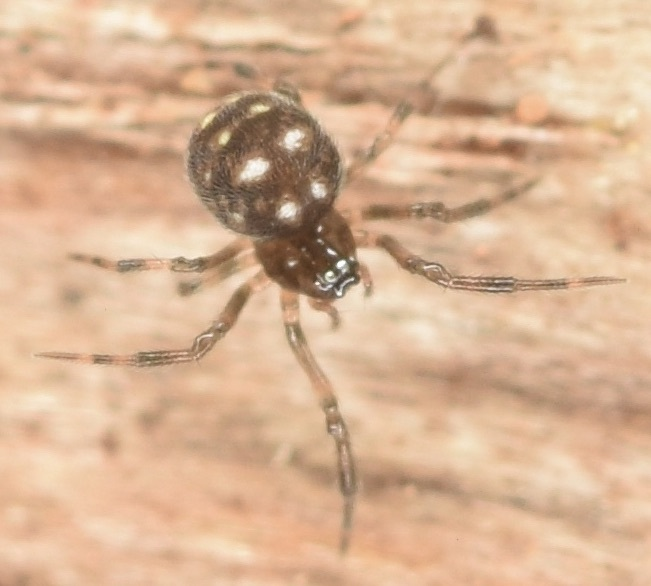
- female Microdipoena guttata
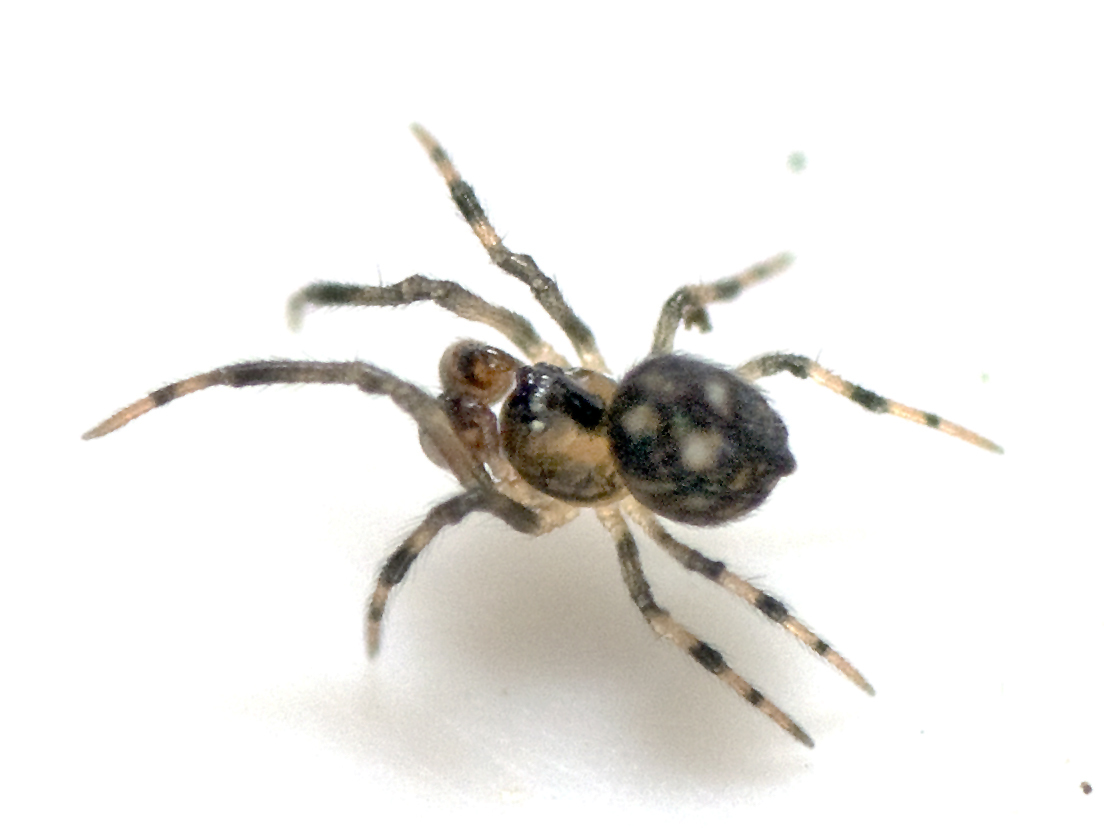
- male Mysmena

Scientific classification
- Kingdom: Animalia
- Phylum: Arthropoda
- Subphylum: Chelicerata
- Class: Arachnida
- Order: Araneae
- Infraorder: Araneomorphae
- Family: Mysmenidae; Petrunkevitch, 1928

Diversity
- 17 genera, 188 species
- blue: reported countries (WSC)

= Mysmenidae =

Spurred orb-weavers Temporal range: Palaeogene–present

Family of spiders

Mysmenidae is a spider family with about 180 described species in seventeen genera. The family is one of the least well known of the orb-weaving spiders because of their small size (0.76 to 3 mm (0.03 to 0.12 in)) and cryptic behaviour. These spiders are found in humid habitats such as among leaf litter and in caves.

== Distribution ==
Species occur in the Americas, Africa, Asia, Europe, New Guinea and several islands.

== Genera ==
As of January 2026, this family includes seventeen genera and 188 species:

- Brasilionata Wunderlich, 1995 – Brazil
- Chanea Miller, Griswold & Yin, 2009 – China
- Chimena Lin & Li, 2022 – China, Taiwan
- Drungena Lin & S. Li, 2023 – China
- Gaoligonga Miller, Griswold & Yin, 2009 – China, Vietnam
- Isela Griswold, 1985 – Kenya, South Africa
- Maymena Gertsch, 1960 – St. Vincent, Costa Rica, Guatemala, Mexico, United States, Peru
- Mengmena Lin & Li, 2022 – China
- Microdipoena Banks, 1895 – Africa, Asia, Canada, Hawaii, New Guinea, Samoa. Introduced to Democratic Republic of the Congo, Comoros, Ivory Coast
- Mosu Miller, Griswold & Yin, 2009 – China
- Mysmena Simon, 1894 – Algeria, St. Helena, China, Indonesia, Vietnam, Israel, Spain, North America, Australia, Fiji, New Caledonia, New Guinea, Niue, Samoa, Galapagos, Guyana, Paraguay, Southern Europe to Azerbaijan
- Mysmeniola Thaler, 1995 – Venezuela
- Mysmenopsis Simon, 1898 – North America, South America
- Phricotelus Simon, 1895 – China, Sri Lanka
- Simaoa Miller, Griswold & Yin, 2009 – China
- Trogloneta Simon, 1922 – China, Japan, Canary Islands, Madeira, North America, Brazil
- Yamaneta Miller & Lin, 2019 – China
